= The Maid in the Mill =

Stage play by John Fletcher and William Rowley

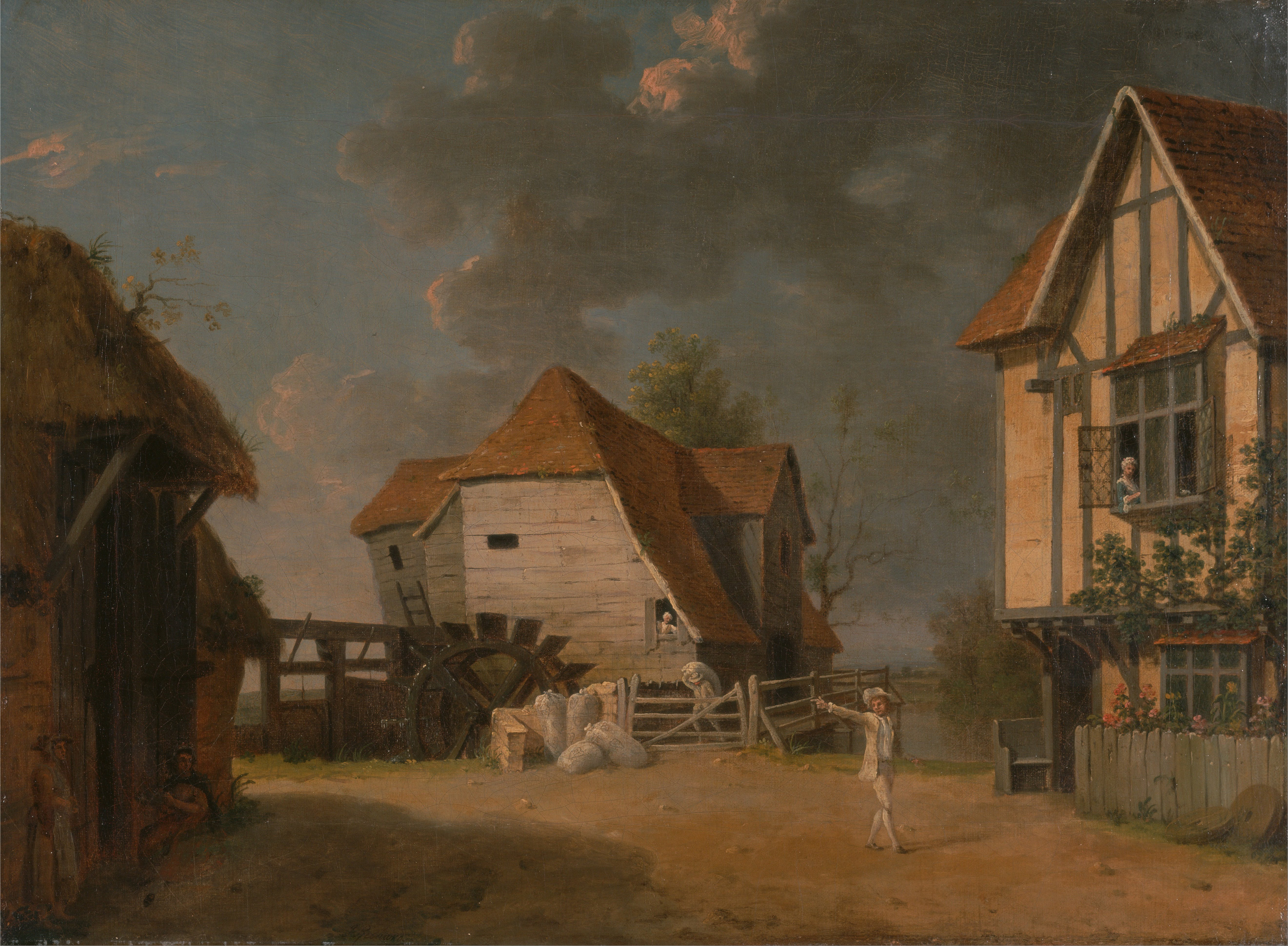
A Scene from The Maid of the Mill

The Maid in the Mill is a late Jacobean era stage play, a comedy written by John Fletcher and William Rowley. It was initially published in the first Beaumont and Fletcher folio of 1647.

== Performance ==
The play was licensed for performance by Sir Henry Herbert, the Master of the Revels, on 29 August 1623. The play was performed by the King's Men at the Globe Theatre. The second Beaumont and Fletcher folio of 1679 provides a cast list for the original production that mentions Joseph Taylor, John Thompson, John Lowin, Robert Benfield, John Underwood, Thomas Pollard, and Rowley himself, who had joined the King's Men in 1623 for the final two years of his acting career, and who in this play filled the comic role of Bustopha. The play was acted at Court in 1628, though with a different cast, since both Rowley and Underwood had died in the intervening years.

== Authorship ==
In his records, Herbert assigns the authorship of the work to Fletcher and Rowley; and scholars have long recognized that the play's internal evidence confirms that attribution. Cyrus Hoy, in his landmark study of authorship problems in Fletcher's canon, provided a breakdown of shares that essentially agreed with the judgements of earlier commentators:

Fletcher – Act I; Act III, scenes 2 and 3; Act V, 2a (first part, to Antonio's entrance);
Rowley – Act II; Act III, scene 1; Act IV; Act V, 1 and 2b (from Antonio's entrance to end).

== Sources ==
The two playwrights took their main plot from Leonard Digges's translation of Gerardo, the Unfortunate Spaniard by Gonzalo de Céspedes y Meneses – a source that Fletcher had exploited for The Spanish Curate in the previous year. They took the Florimel subplot from The Palace of Pleasure by William Painter; and they may also have been influenced by Shakespeare's The Winter's Tale. Fletcher, working with Philip Massinger, would compose a play with a very similar plot a few years later, in The Fair Maid of the Inn (1626).

== After 1660 ==
The Maid in the Mill was revived early in the Restoration era; it was performed twice in the 1661–62 period. Samuel Pepys saw an abbreviated version at Apothecaries' Hall on 29 January 1661.

The play enjoyed a rare modern production, albeit an amateur one: it was acted by a Harvard University fraternity in 1900.

== Synopsis ==
Four Spanish aristocrats, members of the same family, are walking in a meadow. Lisauro and Ismenia are brother and sister, the children of Bellides; they are accompanied by their relations, Terzo and Aminta. They encounter Antonio and his friend Martino. Antonio is the nephew of Julio, and Julio and Bellides are enemies – which affects all the members of their respective families. The men in the two parties draw their swords and prepare to fight, but Ismenia and Aminta prevail on them to part peacefully. Ismenia has a special motive in this: she has fallen in love with Antonio at first sight. She sends Aminta to him with a love letter, inviting him to court her at her window that evening. Antonio is attracted to Ismenia, and taken with her invitation. His friend Martino is at first cynical about romance; but Antonio's growing passion is contagious, and Martino decides to pursue Ismenia himself.

Act II introduces another set of characters: Franio is an old miller, with a wife and two children. His son, Bustopha, is the play's clown; various references to his weight – he is called a "gross compound," with abundant "flesh about him" – show that Bustopha is a fat-clown character, a type of role that Rowley the dramatist repeatedly created for Rowley the actor. When he first appears, Bustopha is reciting nonsense verse – "The gentle whale whose feet so fell / Flies o'er the mountain tops" – in preparation for his role in a local pageant, in which he is absurdly miscast as Paris in the Judgement of Paris. The roles of the three goddesses in the pageant, Juno, Pallas Athena, and Venus, are filled by Ismenia, Aminta, and the miller's daughter Florimel, who is the polar opposite of her foolish brother: Florimel is beautiful, chaste, humble, and virtuous.

Antonio and Martino flirt with the costumed girls; Martino, pretending not to known their identities, tells Ismenia that it is he, Martino, and not Antonio, who truly loves her. The pageant is ruined when Florimel is suddenly kidnapped by a local nobleman, the Count Otrante, and carried away to his castle. It so happens that King Philip (The play calls him Don Philippo) is passing through the neighborhood on his way to Valencia; the miller goes to the King to petition for help in recovering his daughter.

Antonio and Martino continue their pursuit of Ismenia; Antonio sends Bustopha to make excuses for his absence to his uncle Julio – and Bustopha ridiculously makes up a tale of Antonio dying in a duel with Lisauro, giving Julio a good fright. This motivates Julio to seek a resolution of his quarrel with Bellides – who comes to meet him on the same errand; both of the old men have grown fearful for their young relatives' lives if the feud continues. They have heard rumors of the attraction between Antonio and Ismenia, and they decide that such a marriage would be the perfect thing to cement the new amity between them. The young people are less successful at managing their affairs; Antonio and Martino end up fighting in the street and being arrested by the night watchmen.

In his castle, Otrante attempts to seduce Florimel, blustering and threatening – but Florimel stands on her virtue and resists him. He wants her to be his mistress; she suggests marriage, which he firmly rejects – the social gap between them is an insuperable barrier for him. Otrante does not quite have the will to rape her; and when she pleads for a day to consider her situation, he agrees. To soften her will, he tries some psychological manipulation: he has his servants treat her contemptuously, then intercedes as though he is concerned for her feelings. When the next day comes, Florimel turns the tables on Otrante, pretending to a lustful temperament and broad sexual experience. Otrante, who pictured himself ravishing a virgin, loses his appetite for her.

Franio the miller is successful in his appeal to the King: Philip and his courtiers call on Otrante in his castle, and while touring the place Philip forces the exposure of Florimel's presence. The miller's wife Gillian reveals that Florimel is actually Julio's long-lost daughter. Since Florimel is of noble birth, she is now a suitable wife for Otrante – and she assures him that her wantonness was a pretense, and that her virtue is still intact. (And Julio equips her with a dowry too.) The confusions between Antonio and Ismenia are straightened out, and Martino ends up with Aminta, resulting in three couples matched by the play's end.
