= Ralph Crane =

English scrivener

- Born: London, England
- Occupation: Scribe

Ralph Crane (fl. 1615 – 1630) was a professional scrivener or scribe in early seventeenth-century London. His close connection with some of the First Folio texts of the plays of William Shakespeare has led to his being called "Shakespeare's first editor."

== Life ==
What little is known of Crane's life comes from his own writings. In 1621 he published a small collection of his own poems titled The Works of Mercy, Both Corporeal and Spiritual, which he dedicated to John Egerton, 1st Earl of Bridgewater. In the prefatory "Proem" to that volume, Crane indicated that he was a native Londoner, and the son of a successful member of the Merchant Taylors Company (a ' Freeman.'). A possibly relevant reference to a John Crane being in breach of Company ordinances in January 1568 appears in Clode's Memorials. The current ODNB states there is no record of a Ralph Crane among attendees of the Merchant Taylors School, a benefit for Freemen's sons. Ralph Crane spent seven years as the law clerk to Sir Anthony Ashley (d:1601), secretary of the Privy Council; Crane later became a scribe working mainly for attorneys. Thomas Lodge obligated his Scylla's Metamorphosis to a Ralph Crane in 1589; this may have been the poet/scrivener. Crane turned to writing verse late in life, when he was "oppressed by ill health and poverty".

== Shakespeare ==
Crane was working for the King's Men by 1618; he produced multiple transcripts of the company's plays over the next decade and more. The modern scholarly consensus holds that Crane transcripts constituted the copy from which at least five plays were set into type for the First Folio. Those five (in their Folio order) are:

- The Tempest – the first play in the volume
- The Two Gentlemen of Verona – the second play
- The Merry Wives of Windsor – the third play
- Measure for Measure – the fourth play
- The Winter's Tale – the fourteenth play

E. A. J. Honigmann, in his edition of Othello, suggested that Othello should be added as a sixth play to that list; and a few other Folio texts (from Henry IV, Part 2 to Timon of Athens) have been proposed by individual scholars, though without winning wide acceptance. As a result, Crane's scribal peculiarities concerning stage directions, speech prefixes, punctuation and other specifics have received intense attention from generations of scholars, critics, and editors of Shakespeare.

== Others ==
Crane's work for the King's Men was not restricted to Shakespeare (or even to plays, as he copied out the last will and testament of Richard Burbage). The most notable of his other transcripts for the company may well be his manuscript of The Witch, the Thomas Middleton play that has a significant relationship with Macbeth. Crane transcripts provided copy for several plays in the first Beaumont and Fletcher folio of 1647, including The False One, The Knight of Malta, The Prophetess, and The Spanish Curate. The 1623 quarto of John Webster's The Duchess of Malfi was "almost certainly" set into type from a Crane transcript.

None of Crane's Shakespearean manuscripts have survived, but Crane scripts of several other works are extant, in addition to the one for The Witch noted above. Two of the six extant manuscripts of Middleton's A Game at Chess are from Crane's hand. (Crane consistently changed all of Middleton's uses of "has" to "hath" in those transcripts, illustrating the complexities involved in using discriminators like "has/hath" and "does/doth" in stylometry studies.) The play Sir John van Olden Barnavelt, never printed in its own era, survived to modern times in a single Crane manuscript. (In that instance, Crane did a good job of preserving Fletcher's distinctive pattern of textual and stylistic preferences.)

Crane regularly produced what were called presentation manuscripts, copies of favored works for particular clients. On November 27, 1625 he sent his transcript of John Fletcher's play The Humorous Lieutenant to Sir Kenelm Digby. The extant manuscript of Ben Jonson's 1618 masque Pleasure Reconciled to Virtue, known as the Chatsworth manuscript, was a Crane presentation manuscript for Sir Dudley Carleton.

== Sources ==
- Haas, Virginia "Ralph Crane: a status report." Analytical and Enumerative Bibliography. New series III (1989).
- Haas, Michael A. "Ralph Crane: a status report." Analytical and Enumerative Bibliography. New series III (1989).
- Howard-Hill, T. H. Ralph Crane and Some Shakespeare First Folio Comedies. Charlottesville, VA, Bibliographic Society of the University of Virginia, 1972.
- Roberts, Jeanne. "Ralph Crane and the Text of The Tempest." Shakespeare Studies 13 (1980).
- Wilson, F. P. "Ralph Crane, Scrivener to the King's Players." The Library, IV, 7 (1926).
- Clode, C.M. Memorials of the Guild of Merchant Taylors, London, 1875, note p. 217.(J.Crane apprenticed a foreigner)
