= The Island Princess =

Tragicomedy by John Fletcher

The Island Princess is a late Jacobean tragicomedy by John Fletcher, initially published in the first Beaumont and Fletcher folio of 1647.

== The play ==
The authorship and the stage premier of the play are generally thought to have occurred c. 1619–21; it was acted at Court during the latter year, by the King's Men. The second Beaumont/Fletcher folio of 1679 offers a cast list for the play, a list that includes John Lowin, John Underwood, William Ecclestone, Richard Sharpe, Joseph Taylor, Robert Benfield, George Birch, and Thomas Pollard.

== Authorship ==
Fletcher's solo authorship is generally recognized; his characteristic pattern of linguistic preferences is continuous throughout. The 1647 folio text is not especially short, though it does show some signs of cutting: several scenes have characters that appear but do not speak.

== Sources ==
Fletcher's sources were two books on exploration, L'histoire de Ruis Dias, et de Quixaire, Princess des Moloques, a novella by Le Seigneur de Bellan (1615), which derives from the Conquista de las Islas Molucas by Bartolemé Leonardo de Argensola (1609).

== In the Restoration ==
Like many of Fletcher's plays, this play was revived in the Stuart Restoration era in adapted forms. The play was adapted four times, by an anonymous author, by Nahum Tate, by Thomas d'Urfey, and again by Peter Anthony Motteux, the latter being the more successful. The anonymous version, The Island Princess, or The Generous Portugal, was staged before royalty on 6 November 1668; Samuel Pepys saw the production three times in the following year, on 7 January, 9 February and 23 April 1669, at the Theatre Royal, Drury Lane. Motteux's version, replete with songs, dances, and special effects, was popular, and frequently performed, down to 1708. All four adaptations were printed, the anonymous in 1669, d'Urfey's in 1682, Tate's in 1687, and Motteux's in 1699 and 1701.

== Historical background ==
In crafting the play's plot, Fletcher exploits the recent history and contemporary events of his era, involving the European discovery of the East Indies (modern-day Indonesia). During the 16th century, the first Europeans in East Asia – the Spanish, from their colony of the Philippines, and the Portuguese, operating out of their base in Malacca (conquered in 1511) – sought trading rights and influence in the Spice Islands, the modern Moluccas or Maluku Islands. Several small independent states in the region, notably the islands of Tidore and Ternate, controlled much of the spice production of the region, and constituted a tempting target of European greed and ambition. The Portuguese eventually became dominant in the later 16th century (though Spain ruled Portugal in the 1580–1640 era). While the Portuguese never fully conquered and colonised the Spice Islands, they were commercially and militarily predominant in the area for several decades – though by Fletcher's era the Portuguese were being supplanted by the Dutch.

Fletcher does not strive for factual accuracy in his treatment of his subject. Most notably, he mischaracterises the Muslim populations of Tidore and neighbouring states as pagans. Quisara and other members of the indigenous culture refer to their "gods," and Quisara says that they worship the Sun and Moon. The play's Christian protagonist Armusia considers them devil worshippers.

== Synopsis ==
The play opens with a conversation among three Portuguese gentlemen: Piniero and two confederates discuss the current political situation on Tidore. The King of Tidore has recently been captured by the Governor of Ternate, a local rival; but this does not prevent the Governor from joining the group of suitors that clusters around the King's sister, Princess Quisara. She is a celebrated beauty and a highly desirable potential match; local rulers, the Kings of Bacan and Syana, vie for her favour – as does a prominent member of the Portuguese community, Piniero's uncle Ruy Dias. The local rulers, vain and pompous, quarrel among themselves; Quisara clearly prefers the more serious and mature Dias. Quisara humbles her suitors with a bold challenge: she will marry the man who rescues her brother the King from captivity. Even Ruy Dias's spirit is temporarily quelled; he says he must consult with his councillors before taking any action.

One man present is not cowed: Armusia is a new arrival in the region, and with two friends he decides to take precipitate action to rescue the captured King. Sailing to Ternate, Armusia masquerades as a merchant, rents a house next to the Governor's palace and prison, and loads it with gunpowder. When night comes he sets off the charge, and while the people of Ternate cope with the resulting conflagration, Armusia and his companions stage a prison break and free the King. They sail back to Tidore before the Governor and his officials can prevent them.

The rescue creates a sensation on Tidore. The King is abundantly grateful for rescue; but Quisara is appalled to find that her promise now commits her to marry a man she has never met. She reproves Ruy Dias for his slowness of action, and for allowing this situation to develop. Ruy Dias is humiliated, and in conversation with his nephew Piniero hints that he would like to see Armusia killed. Piniero encourages the idea; he plays with the role of villain, but only to provoke and study the reactions of others. Piniero goes to Quisara, and she too seems to welcome the idea of Armusia's death.

Armusia is depressed by Quisara's coldness and hostility, but his friends urge him to pursue the princess boldly – even encouraging him to ravish her. Armusia does not go so far, though he does bribe (with a kiss and a jewel) Panura, Quisara's waiting woman, into granting him access to Quisara's private apartment. Quisara is offended by his violation of her privacy, but Armusia charms her with his courtly manners and palliates much of her hostility. Ruy Dias, coming to see the princess, passes Armusia on his way out, and realises that he is losing the contest for the island princess's affections. He dismisses the idea of murder as unworthy, and challenges Armusia to a duel. They fight as Quisara watches: Armusia wounds Dias and wins the duel, but treats his defeated rival with nobility and compassion.

The Governor of Ternate, attempting to get back at Armusia and the Portuguese, adopts a disguise as a native holy man; he uses his intimate knowledge of courtly affairs to impress the King and Quisara with his insight and wisdom. He stirs up ill-will against the Europeans on religious grounds. Quisara agrees to marry Armusia – but she asks him to convert to the native religion, a notion that Armusia rejects, in angry and insulting terms. The disguised governor manipulates the King into imprisoning Armusia as a result.

Armusia faces torture, but refuses to bend on the matter of religious principle. Ruy Dias and the other Portuguese attack Tidore to rescue him; in the process, Piniero and Panura expose the Governor of Ternate's disguise and manipulations. Seeing that they have been duped, the King forms a pact with the Europeans, and Quisara, awed by Armusia's courage and faith, experiences a conversion to Christianity, opening the way for their marriage.

== Critical responses and analyses ==
Along with The Sea Voyage, another play in Fletcher's canon, The Island Princess has been discussed by some late 20th century scholars and critics as part of the literature of colonialism and anti-colonialism. Furthermore, Michael Neill believes there is particular symbolism to the repeated image of fire in the play, claiming they represent the psychological state of the characters.

More contemporary analyses of the play focus on the sexual and religious relationship of the Portuguese colonizers and the island natives. Ania Loomba paints the transformation of Quisara throughout the play as a symbol for the eastern lands the Europeans sought after. The Spice Island princess challenges her suitors to save her brother, the King, with the promise of marriage. She also requests that Armusia change his religion, yet, upon becoming enamored with him, willingly assimilates into his Christian world. The 180-degree adjustment of Quisara's faith and religious values is what Loomba superimposes on the growing orientalism of the 19th century. The wooing of Quisara is emblematic of eastern lands, awaiting the conquering and colonialization of the west.

Loomba also considers the portrayal and symbolism of the Europeans in this tropical setting. Armusia's delayed arrival to the islands, as well as his differing status of beliefs to both the colonizers and the natives, is a metaphor for England's late entry into the global imperialism beside the Dutch and Portuguese. Armusia's presence and success are similarly emblematic of England's new wave of imperialism, different from its fading predecessors. Armusia is encouraged by the Portuguese to ravish Quisara, which he actively chooses not to do. Instead, he is able to enamor the princess, a more courtly, refined approach compared to that suggested by the Portuguese. Even the name Armusia is a reference to the growing English power, as it is an alternate naming for Hormuz, a site where the English would defeat the established Portuguese influence.

Carmen Nocentelli also notes transformative elements in the play that are symbolic of a changing influence in England. Both the revival of the noble gentleman in Armusia and his disguise as a merchant are important, as they signify the retooling of the chivalric mannerisms. Characteristics of feudal knights, who valiantly served their lords, are now projected onto the merchant class to serve as a reminder of their role in the expansion of the Queen's new empire.
