= The Spanish Maze =

The Spanish Maze is a lost Jacobean stage drama whose author is unknown. It was performed at the court of King James I on 11 February 1605 by The King's Men, the acting company of William Shakespeare. It was one of ten plays performed there during the 1604-1605 holiday season, including seven by Shakespeare and two by Ben Jonson, and the only one of the ten now lost. A few scholars have suggested that The Spanish Maze was an early version of Shakespeare's The Tempest.
