= The Coxcomb (play) =

1647 stage play

The Coxcomb is an early Jacobean era stage play, a comedy written by Francis Beaumont and John Fletcher. It was initially published in the first Beaumont and Fletcher folio of 1647.

== Date and performance ==
Scholars date the play to c. 1608–10, based on contemporary allusions and availability of sources. (It has been argued that one of the play's sources was the "Curious Impertinent" episode in Don Quixote, which was published in French translation in 1608, that translation being the playwrights' source. Ben Jonson refers to the play in The Alchemist in 1610.) The Coxcomb was performed at Court early in November 1612 by the Children of the Queen's Revels.

The play's text in the second Beaumont and Fletcher folio of 1679 provides a cast list for one production, a list that cites Nathan Field, Joseph Taylor, Giles Gary, Emanuel Read, Richard Allen, Hugh Atawell, Robert Benfield, and William Barkstead. This combination of personnel matches not the Queen's Revels Children but the Lady Elizabeth's Men. The former company combined with the latter for a time in 1613. The children's troupe later passed out of existence, leaving some of its plays, including The Coxcomb, behind with the Lady Elizabeth's company.

The play then passed into the possession of the King's Men, who acted it at Court on 5 March 1622, and on 17 November 1636.

== Characters ==
- Richardo: A young gentleman, in love with Viola.
- Antonio: Gentleman and the titular Coxcomb, husband to Maria
- Mercury: A gentleman who has returned from travels with Antonio, in love with Maria
- Uberto, Pedro, and Silvio: City gallants, friends of Richardo.
- Valerio: A country gentleman
- Curio: Antonio’s kinsman
- Justice: A feeble and superficial country justice
- Alexander: Servant to Mercury's mother.
- Mark: the justice’s clerk
- Andrugio: Viola’s wealthy father
- Rowland: Servant to Andrugio
- Tinker: A pimp
- Constable and the Watch: Peacekeepers in the city
- The Drawer: A tavern boy
- Viola: Andrugio’s daughter, in love with Richardo
- Maria: A gentlewoman, wife of Antonio
- Nan and Madge: Milkmaids on the estate of Mercury’s mother
- Dorothy: A prostitute
- A Country-Woman: Mercury’s mother

== Plot ==
The play opens with Viola, a sixteen-year old girl, and Richardo, a young gentleman, two lovers with plans to elope despite Viola’s father’s (Andrugio) distaste for Richardo and their relationship. Before separating, they plan to meet at midnight to run off, with Viola bringing her money and jewels. Meanwhile, Antonio, a coxcomb gentleman, and Mercury, his traveling companion, return to Antonio’s home after their Grand Tour. At Antonio's house, they find a feast hosted by Antonio’s wife, Maria. At this feast, Richardo meets with his friends (Uberto, Pedro, and Silvio), who convince him to go drinking before his plans to meet up with Viola. Away from them, Mercury is entranced by the woman the friends were speaking to, Maria, who turns out to be Antonio's wife. Antonio offers his wife to Mercury believing it'll make them better friends, but Mercury worries in an aside that Antonio will become a cuckold. Later that night, Richardo and his friends have drank the night away–leaving them reckless and intoxicated– causing Richardo to be late to meet Viola. When Viola finally comes to find Richardo, she ends up being harassed and seized by the young men which causes her to run away.

Mercury is kept up at night with thoughts of Maria; in response, he calls Antonio to his room to tell him how he wishes to leave because he loves Maria. Antonio and Mercury create a plan for Mercury to woo Maria. During their conversation, Viola is looking for shelter from the night and knocks on Antonio’s door but Antonio claims that the one at the door can not be Viola as Viola is home with her father. Not being let inside, Viola returns to the streets where Tinker, a pimp, and his trull, Dorothy, rob Viola by tying her up. Then, a gentleman passing by named Valerio and his servant save Viola. Valerio asks Viola to accompany him to his country house, and she agrees. All while Mercury and Antonio devise a plan to win the affections of Antonio's wife for Mercury. Antonio disguises himself and delivers a love letter to Maria, but she sees through his disguise and he recognizes her husband, and has her servant beat him for his foppery. Meanwhile, Richardo is still with his friends and is trying to convince them to go drinking again. They try to discourage him from drinking despite their insistence last night. This conversation goes on until Andrugio comes in with a servant holding Viola’s nightgown. He tells Richardo she was attacked and is now missing. Andrugio tells Richardo that if he can find Viola, he will bless the marriage between them. In wake of this information, Richardo laments the way he acted before and vows to go find Viola.

Confronted with the lover, Mercury denies writing Maria a love letter. Maria lies telling Mercury her husband is murdered. Thinking Antonio is dead, Mercury believes he should be with Maria, because Antonio can no longer be a cuckold. Back in the countryside, Valerio and Viola are almost at his house; he then tries to convince her to make love to him. Viola turns him down, so he then leaves her on the side of the road and takes off. Viola meets two milkmaids who work for Mercury’s mother. She proceeds to go with them to work and goes by the name Melvia.

Antonio is told by servants his wife and Mercury went to the country, and he wants to know what they’re up to believing he's dead. Antonio arrives disguised as a postman wanting to deliver a letter to Maria, telling her that Antonio wishes for Mercury and Maria to be together. Richardo finds Valerio and learns of his interactions with Viola and how he left her all alone. Meanwhile, Viola starts to work as a kitchen servant, where she is treated harshly.

Antonio's cousin, Curio arrives searching for Mercury believing Antonio has been murdered. Valerio shows Richardo where he left Viola, while they are there Viola appears with the milkmaids. When Richardo and Viola meet again, Valerio and the milkmaids are sent away to leave them alone. When they are alone together, Richardo starts to beg her for forgiveness. Viola does not accept this initially, but tells Richardo if he is truly sorry he will come with her and prove he has changed. At that time, the justice arrive at Mercury's house and want to whip the postman for information. Suddenly, Antonio appears taking off his post costume. The play comes to an end when Mercury invites everyone to stay for dinner.

== Authorship ==
Cyrus Hoy, in his survey of authorship problems in the canon of Fletcher and his collaborators, provided this breakdown between the respective shares of Beaumont and Fletcher:

Beaumont — Act I, scene 4; Act II, 4; Act IV, 1, 3, and 7; Act V;
Fletcher — Act I, scenes 1-3 and 5; Act II, 1 and 3; Act III, 1 and 2; Act IV, 2, 4-6, and 8;
Beaumont and Fletcher — Act I, scene 6; Act II, 2; Act III, 3.

Critics have long recognized that the existing text is a revised version of the Beaumont and Fletcher original, likely done for one of the King's Men's revivals. The favorite candidate for the reviser is Philip Massinger, a major participant in Fletcher's canon; but William Rowley has also been considered. If the revision was done for the 1636 revival, as some believe, Rowley would be eliminated, since he died a decade earlier.

== After 1642 ==
Along with many other plays in Fletcher's canon, The Coxcomb was revived during the Restoration era; it proved popular, and was reprinted in a single-play edition in 1718. The play is one of the relatively few Beaumont/Fletcher works given a performance in later centuries; it was acted by the Elizabethan Stage Society in the Hall of the Inner Temple on 10 February 1898 – a production reviewed by George Bernard Shaw.

Shakespeare’s Globe Education series ‘Read Not Dead’ featured The Coxcomb at Sam Wanamaker Playhouse in 2016, the 400th anniversary of Beaumont’s death.
