= The Mad Lover =

Jacobean stage play by John Fletcher

The Mad Lover is a Jacobean stage play, a tragicomedy by John Fletcher. It was initially published in the first Beaumont and Fletcher folio of 1647. Fletcher's sole authorship was specified during the 17th century by his friend Sir Aston Cockayne. It displays Fletcher's distinctive pattern of stylistic and textual preferences throughout the text, so that his authorship is not questioned.

== Performance ==
The play was acted by the King's Men; the cast list added in the second Beaumont and Fletcher folio of 1679 includes Richard Burbage, John Lowin, Robert Benfield, William Ecclestone, Nathan Field, Richard Sharpe, and Henry Condell. This indicates a production between 1616, when Field joined the company, and Burbage's death in March 1619. Lady Anne Clifford mentions in her diary seeing a performance of the play at court on 5 January 1617 (new style). The play was revived in 1630.

The play was revived early in the Restoration era, with Edward Kynaston in the role of the princess (when women onstage were still an innovation and a rarity). Samuel Pepys saw it at the Salisbury Court Theatre on 9 February 1661, again on 2 December the same year, and again on 18 February 1669. On Sunday, 25 September 1664, he "spent all the morning reading of 'The Madd Lovers', a very good play."

The play was adapted to meet changing tastes, as were other Fletcher plays; a version by Peter Anthony Motteux was scored with music and songs by John Eccles and Daniel Purcell and staged by Thomas Betterton in 1703–1704.

The play has not been performed using Fletcher's text since the late 17th century. In November 2025 to celebrate the 400th anniversary of John Fletcher's death, the US Naval Academy Masqueraders will perform the 21st century and North American premiere of the play.

== Sources ==
Fletcher drew materials for this play from Honoré D'Urfé's novel Astrée, as he did for Monsieur Thomas and Valentinian. Fletcher also borrowed plot materials from Bandello and Josephus. The point in which Cleanthe suborns a priestess to obtain a favorable oracle for her brother Syphax is a version of the Paulina and Mundus story in Josephus.

== Melancholy and music ==
The Mad Lover, in line with its title, deals with a case of "melancholia" or depression over an unsatisfactory romantic attachment. In this it relates to several other dramas of its era, including Fletcher's The Noble Gentleman, The Nice Valour and John Ford's The Lover's Melancholy. The Mad Lover has been noted as "the most extensive example within a single play of the use of musical sound and imagery in the depiction and cure of madness." The characters in the play put on a masque in an attempt to treat the mad general, Memnon; drawing on the myth of Orpheus, it is a masque of beasts and trees, with an ape, a dog, a lion, and dancing trees – all formerly men and foolish lovers.

In 1897, Charles Villiers Stanford composed and orchestrated a musical setting for an excerpt from The Mad Lover, entitled "The Battle of Pelusium."
