= Leonard Digges =

Leonard Digges may refer to:

- Leonard Digges (scientist) (c. 1515–c. 1559), English mathematician and surveyor
- Leonard Digges (writer) (1588–1635), his grandson, Hispanist and minor poet
