= Marco Antonio de Dominis =

Dalmatian ecclesiastic and scientist (1560–1624)

The Most Reverend Mark Antun de Dominis Marco Antonio de Dominis
- Archbishop of Split; Primate of Dalmatia and all Croatia
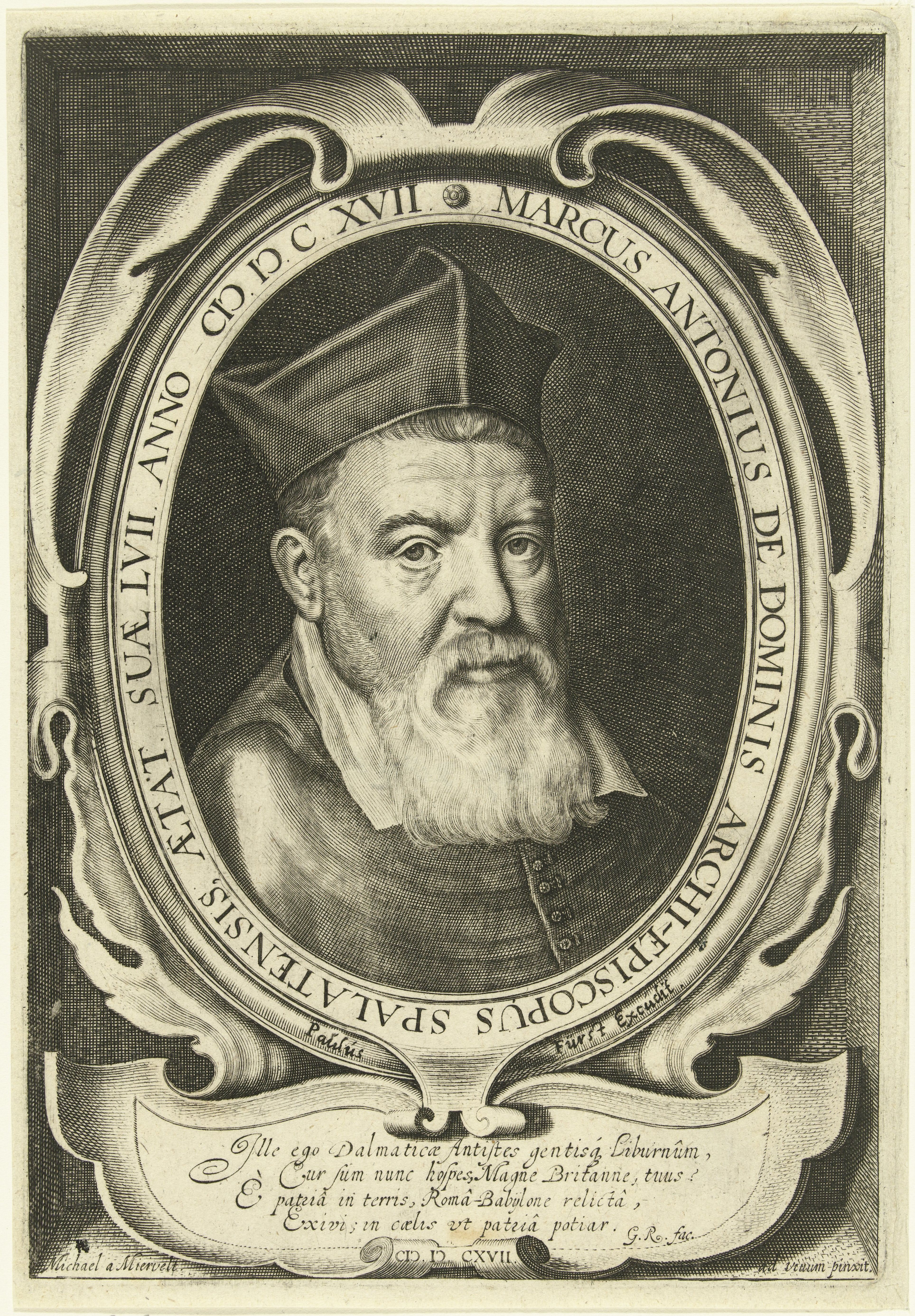
- Portrait from De Republica Ecclesiastica (1610)
- Church: Roman Catholic
- Archdiocese: Split
- See: Split
- Appointed: 15 November 1602
- In office: 1602–1616
- Predecessor: Ivan Dominik Marcot
- Successor: Sfortia Ponzoni
- Other posts: Bishop of Senj (1600–1602); Dean of Windsor (1619–1622)

Orders
- Consecration: October 1600

Personal details
- Born: Marco Antonio De Dominis; 1560 Rab, Croatia
- Died: 7 September 1624 (aged 64) Rome, Papal States

Styles of Markantun de Dominis
- Reference style: The Most Reverend
- Spoken style: Your Excellency
- Religious style: Archbishop; Primate

Marco Antonio de Dominis (Croatian: Mark Antun de Dominis; 1560 – 7 September 1624) was a Dalmatian ecclesiastic, polymath, man of science and sometime archbishop of Split and Primate of Dalmatia and all Croatia, who later joined the Church of England.

== Early life ==
He was born on the island of Rab Croatia, off the coast of Dalmatia, in a noble family of Dalmatian origin. (Note: In one of letters written by Fulgenzio Micanzio addressed to William Cavendish, 1st Earl of Devonshire and translated by Thomas Hobbes, Micanzio introduced De Dominis to William Cavendish as a man born in a noble Dalmatian family: "He was born of a principall family of a Dalmatia called in that tongue Domnianich which we would call De Dominis".) Educated at the Illyrian College at Loreto and at the University of Padua, he entered the Society of Jesus in 1579 and taught mathematics, logic, and rhetoric at Padua and Brescia, Italy.

He was educated by the Jesuits in their colleges at Loreto and Padua, and is supposed by some to have joined the Society; the more usual opinion, however, is that he was dissuaded from doing so by Cardinal Aldobrandini. For some time he was employed as a teacher at Verona, a professor of mathematics at Padua, and a professor of rhetoric and philosophy at Brescia.

== Religious politics ==
In 1596 he was, through imperial influence, appointed Bishop of Senj and Modruš in Croatia in August 1600, and transferred in November 1602 to the archiepiscopal see of Split. His endeavors to reform the church soon brought him into conflict with his suffragans; and the interference of the papal court with his rights as metropolitan, an attitude intensified by the quarrel between the Papacy and Venice, made his position intolerable. This, at any rate, is the account given in his own apology, the Consilium profectionis in which he also states that it was these troubles that led him to those researches into ecclesiastical law, church history, and dogmatic theology, which, while confirming him in his love for the ideal of the true Catholic Church, convinced him that the papal system was far from approximating to it.

He sided with Venice, in whose territory his diocese was situated, during the quarrel between Pope Paul V and the Republic (1606–7). That fact, combined with a correspondence with Paolo Sarpi and conflicts with his clergy and fellow bishops, which culminated in the loss of an important financial case in the Roman Curia, led to the resignation of his office in favor of a relative and his retirement to Venice.

== To England ==
Threatened by the Inquisition, he prepared to apostatize, entered into communication with the English ambassador to Venice, Sir Henry Wotton, and having been assured of a welcome, left for England in 1616.

He was received with open arms by James I, who quartered him upon Archbishop Abbot of Canterbury, called on the other bishops to pay him a pension, and granted him precedence after the archbishops of Canterbury and York. De Dominis took part, as assistant, in the consecration of George Montaigne as Bishop of Lincoln, and Nicolas Felton as Bishop of Bristol on 14 December 1617. In that same year, James I made him Dean of Windsor and granted him the Mastership of the Savoy.

Contemporary writers give no pleasant account of him, describing him as fat, irascible, pretentious and very avaricious; but his ability was undoubted, and in the theological controversies of the time he soon took a foremost place.

His vanity, avarice, and irascibility soon lost him his English friends; the projected Spanish marriage of Prince Charles made him anxious about the security of his position in England, and the election of Pope Gregory XV (9 February 1621) furnished him with an occasion of intimating, through Catholic diplomatists in England, his wish to return to Rome.

The king's anger was aroused when De Dominis announced his intention (16 January 1622), and Star-Chamber proceedings for illegal correspondence with Rome were threatened. Eventually he was allowed to depart, but his chests of hoarded money were seized by the king's men and only restored in response to a piteous personal appeal to the king.

== Return to Rome ==
Once out of England, his attacks upon the English Church were as violent as had been those on the Papacy, and in Sui Reditus ex Anglia Consilium (Paris, 1623) he recanted all he had written in his Consilium Profectionis (London, 1616), declaring that he had deliberately lied in all that he had said against Rome. After a stay of six months in Brussels he proceeded to Rome, where he lived on a pension assigned him by the Pope. On the death of Pope Gregory XV on 8 July 1623 the pension ceased, and irritation loosened his tongue.

Coming into conflict with the Inquisition he was declared a relapsed heretic and was confined to the Castel Sant'Angelo. He there died a natural death in September 1624.

Even his death did not end his trial. His case was continued after his death, and on 20 December 1624 judgment was pronounced over his corpse in the Church of Santa Maria sopra Minerva. His heresy was declared manifest, and by order of the Inquisition his body was taken from the coffin, dragged through the streets of Rome, and publicly burned in the Campo di Fiore together with his works, on 21 December 1624.

By a strange irony, the publication of his Reditus consilium was subsequently forbidden in Venice because of its uncompromising advocacy of the supremacy of the Pope over the temporal powers. As a theologian and an ecclesiastic Dominis was thoroughly discredited; as a man of science he was more happy.

== Works ==
=== Scientific ===
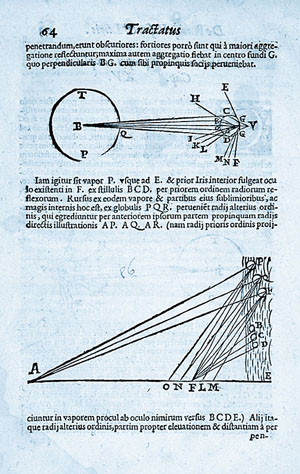
From theory of the rainbow

In 1611 he published, at Venice, a scientific work entitled: Tractatus de radiis visus et lucis in vitris, perspectivis et iride, in which, according to Isaac Newton, he was the first to develop the theory of the rainbow by drawing attention to the fact that in each raindrop the light undergoes two refractions and an intermediate reflection. His claim to that distinction is, however, disputed in favor of Descartes.

In 1625 his work "Euripus, seu de fluxu et refluxu maris sententia" was published posthumously in Rome. It is an important source for the strange story of the theory of tides. It contains an exact but qualitative, luni-solar explanation of the phaenomena. This explanation is directly connected with the later developments.

=== Religious ===
On his way to England, he published at Heidelberg a violent attack on Rome: Scogli del Christiano naufragio, afterwards reprinted in England.

In England, he wrote a number of anti-Roman sermons: the Papatus Romanus, issued anonymously (London, 1617; Frankfort, 1618); the Scogli del naufragio Christiano, written in Switzerland (London, (?) 1618), of which English, French and German translations also appeared; and a Sermon preached in Italian before the king.

His principal work was the De Republicâ Ecclesiasticâ contra Primatum Papæ (Vol. 1, 1617; vol. II, 1620, London; Vol. III, 1622, Hanau). The first part, after revision by Anglican theologians, was published under royal patronage in London (1617). In the main it is an elaborate treatise on the historic organization of the church, its principal note being its insistence on the divine prerogatives of the Catholic episcopate as against the encroachments of the papal monarchy.

In 1619 Dominis published in London from a manuscript Paolo Sarpi's Historia del Concilio Tridentino. This history of the Council of Trent appeared in Italian, with an anti-Roman title page and letter dedicatory to James I. The manuscript had been obtained from Sarpi for George Abbot by his agent Nathaniel Brent.

== Representations ==
De Dominis was caricatured in Thomas Middleton's 1624 play A Game at Chess. He is portrayed as the cynical 'Fat Bishop of Spalato' who changes faiths as much as it suits him.

== See also ==
- In necessariis unitas, in dubiis libertas, in omnibus caritas
