= John Underwood (actor) =

English actor

John Underwood (died October 1624) was an early 17th-century actor, a member of the King's Men, the theatrics company of William Shakespeare.

== Career ==
Underwood began as a boy player with the Children of the Chapel, and was cast in that company's productions of Ben Jonson's Cynthia's Revels (1600) and The Poetaster (1601). In 1608 or soon after, he joined the King's Men along with William Ostler, another former member of the Chapel Children troupe. Underwood was a member of the cast of the King's Men's production of Jonson's The Alchemist in 1610, and was in the casts of many productions that followed, including Jonson's Catiline (1611) and John Webster's The Duchess of Malfi (the revival of c. 1621).

In the 25 cast lists added to plays in the second Beaumont and Fletcher folio of 1679, Underwood is mentioned in the casts of 18 dramas:

- Bonduca
- The Custom of the Country
- The Double Marriage
- The False One
- The Humorous Lieutenant
- The Island Princess
- The Knight of Malta
- The Laws of Candy
- The Little French Lawyer
- The Lovers' Progress
- The Loyal Subject
- The Maid in the Mill
- The Pilgrim
- The Queen of Corinth
- The Sea Voyage
- Valentinian
- A Wife for a Month
- Women Pleased

His total appearances equals those of Joseph Taylor and Robert Benfield, and is exceeded only by John Lowin's 21. Considering that his career was two decades shorter than Taylor's or Benfield's (both of whom acted until the theatres closed in 1642), Underwood was clearly a mainstay of the company during his acting career.

== His will ==
Underwood died between 4 and 10 October 1624. His last will and testament was drawn up on the 4th; a codicil was appended on the 11th, after his death. He left his property in a trust for his five minor children (John, Elizabeth, Burbage, Thomas, and Isabel). His executors and overseers, who included John Lowin, Henry Condell, and John Heminges, were left 11 shillings each to buy memorial rings. Shakespeare's 1616 will had left Condell, Heminges and Richard Burbage 28 shillings sixpence (28s. 6d.) each for the same purpose.

== Theatre shares ==
Underwood's property included shares in the King's Men's theatres, the Globe and the Blackfriars, as well as a share in the Curtain Theatre in Shoreditch. The last is a significant point. Thomas Pope, a member of the Lord Chamberlain's Men who died in 1603, had also possessed a share in the Curtain and had listed it in his will. As far as is known, Henry Lanman, who built the Curtain in 1577, had originally run that theatre as his private business; yet sometime before 1603 the Curtain had clearly been re-organized into a shareholders' enterprise. The fact that two men of Shakespeare's troupe owned shares in the Curtain suggests that this re-organization occurred around the time the Lord Chamberlain's Men were acting at the Curtain in the 1597–99 period. (Pope was a member of the company at that time, while Underwood was not; the implication is that Underwood purchased his share in the Curtain from another troupe member.)

When the brothers Richard and Cuthbert Burbage built The Globe Theatre in early 1599, they organized it as a shareholders' concern, keeping 50% of the business for themselves and dividing the other 50% among four of the Lord Chamberlain's Men – Shakespeare, Pope, Heminges, and Augustine Phillips. (Originally William Kempe was meant to be the seventh partner, but he sold out to the other four minority shareholders, giving each of them a 12.5% stake instead of 10%.) It has been argued that the Burbages pursued this arrangement out of necessity: their financial problems involving The Theatre and the Blackfriars left them in need of outside investors. It is generally held that the Globe arrangement constituted the first case in which the standard sharers' partnership in a playing company was extended to theatre construction and ownership. Yet the Curtain Theatre shares owned by Underwood and Pope suggest that the Globe was perhaps not the initial instance of such an arrangement, and that the Burbages applied to the Globe a structure that was already familiar to the Lord Chamberlain's Men from the Curtain.
