= The Spanish Curate =

Stage play by John Fletcher and Philip Massinger

The Spanish Curate is a late Jacobean era stage play, a comedy written by John Fletcher and Philip Massinger. It premiered on the stage in 1622, and was first published in 1647.

== Date and source ==
The play was licensed for production by Sir Henry Herbert, the Master of the Revels, on 24 October 1622. The dramatists' source for their plot, the Spanish novel Gerardo, the Unfortunate Spaniard by Gonzalo de Céspedes y Meneses, was first published in English, in a translation by Leonard Digges, earlier in the same year.

== Performance and publication ==
The Spanish Curate was acted by the King's Men, and was performed by that troupe at Court on Saint Stephen's Day, 26 December 1622. The partial cast list of the premiere production, published in the second Beaumont and Fletcher folio of 1679, includes Joseph Taylor, William Ecclestone, John Lowin, Thomas Pollard, Nicholas Tooley, and Robert Benfield.

The play received its initial publication in the first Beaumont and Fletcher folio of 1647. It was likely set into type from a prompt-book manuscript that was the work of Ralph Crane, the scribe who, in the same era, was preparing texts for the First Folio of Shakespeare's plays.

== Authorship ==
Given the highly distinctive profile of Fletcher's literary style, critics have found it relatively easy to distinguish between the respective shares of the two authors. Cyrus Hoy, in his major study of authorship problems in Fletcher's canon, arrived at this differentiation, which largely agrees with the work of previous critics:

Massinger – Act I; Act III, scene 3; Act IV, 1, 2, and 4; Act V, 1 and 3;
Fletcher – Act II; Act III, scenes 1, 2, and 4; Act IV, 3 and 5–7; Act V, 2.

Massinger took primary responsibility for the main plot, while Fletcher handled the subplot.

== In the Restoration ==
The play was revived during the Restoration era, and was popular. Samuel Pepys saw it performed on 16 March 1661 by the King's Company, and again on 17 May 1669; productions continued into the 1670s and 1680s. Adapted forms of the play were staged at Drury Lane in 1749, and at Covent Garden in 1783 and as late as 1840.

== Synopsis ==
Set in Spain, the play deals with a conflict between two brothers over their inheritance. Don Henrique is older than Don Jamie by a year; under the system of primogeniture, Henrique is the heir to their father's estate. The late father's will gives Jamie a small income, but Henrique treats his younger brother with rudeness and condescension, breeding a hostile relationship between the two. The problem is that Henrique and his wife, Violante, have been married for a dozen years but have no children—leaving Jamie as Henrique's heir.

Jamie is a member of a circle of aristocratic friends, which includes a boy named Ascanio. The boy is the son of poor parents, but is admired for his grace and nobility of character. Among Jamie's friends is Leandro, a lusty young man who is interested in the beautiful Amaranta. She is married to the rapacious lawyer Bartolus; the attorney keeps Jamie closely watched, and Leandro has developed a scheme to seduce her. He masquerades as a wealthy law student come to take instruction from Bartolus. The go-between in this is Lopez, the local curate and the title character.

Don Henrique, angered over Jamie's status as his heir, makes a radical move to change the situation: he files a legal suit (Bartolus is his lawyer) to have the boy Ascanio declared his heir. Henrique testifies that before he married Violante, he was engaged or "precontracted" to Ascanio's mother Jacinta, and that the boy is his natural son. (Like other plays of the era, The Spanish Curate exploits the legal and ethical ambiguity of the precontract, which in some interpretations was like a demi-marriage...but not quite.) After the child's birth, Henrique had second thoughts about the social gap between himself and Jacinta, and got the precontract cancelled. Jacinta can only affirm the basic truth of Henrique's testimony; and on that basis, Henrique wins his suit. Ascanio is now his legal heir, and Jamie is out.

Violante, however, is outraged that Henrique has exposed this shameful affair and effectively thrown her infertility in her face. She bullies her husband into reversing course and driving Ascanio out of his house; Henrique offers the boy financial support, but the child returns to Jacinta and his pretended father Octavio. Violante is not satisfied with this, however; she reveals herself to be a truly ruthless person when she solicits Jamie to murder both Henrique and Ascanio and so come into his family fortune immediately.

Leandro works his way into the trust of Bartolus, and tries to seduce Amaranta; she is tempted by him, but stands on her virtue and fidelity. When Bartolus finally becomes suspicious, Amaranta can show that she and Leandro have been in church, and not having a sexual assignation.

The plot comes to a head in the final act: Violante meets Jamie and his pretended accomplices for the double murder—only to have her plot exposed. Henrique is shocked into penitence by the exposure of his wife's murder plot—and reveals that he and Violante are not actually, fully legally, married after all. Bartolus too is cowed by his involvement in the matter, and vows to change his ways. Jamie has no problem accepting Ascanio as his nephew, now that their family relations are better ordered. Massinger ends the play with a couplet extolling the middle way in marital relations, between too much pliability in a husband (like Henrique) and too little (like Bartolus)—much like the concluding couplet in Massinger's later play The Picture.
