= The False One =

Jacobean stage play by John Fletcher and Philip Massinger

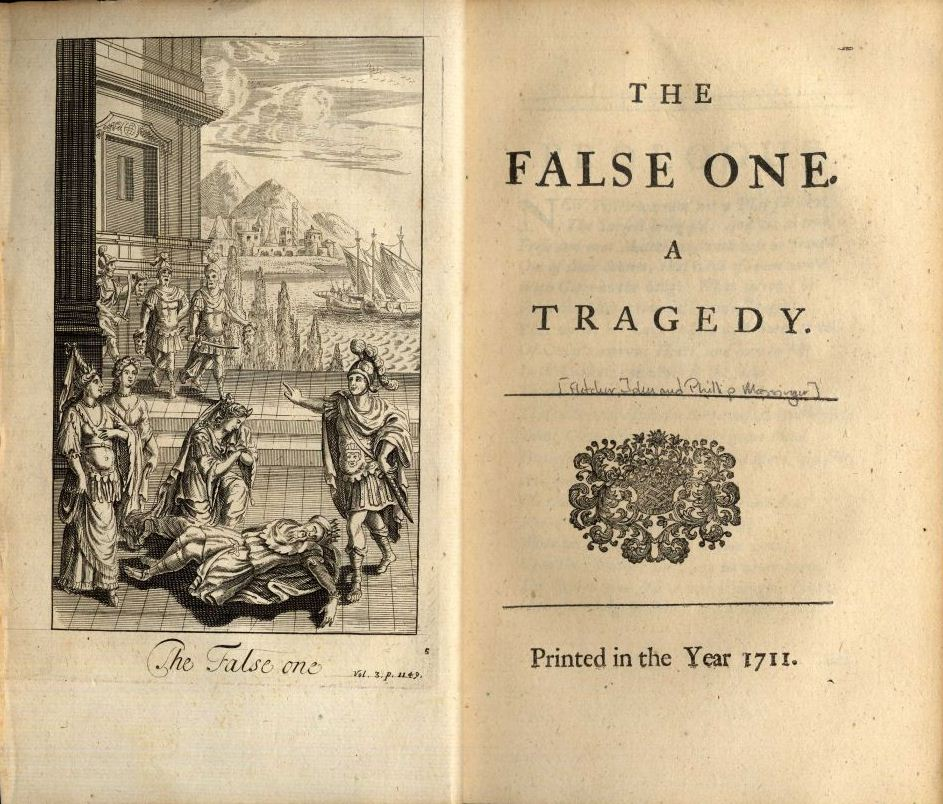
- frontispiece to The False One, 1711 edition
- Original language: English
- Written by: John Fletcher and Philip Massinger
- Subject: Julius Caesar meets Cleopatra
- Genre: history play
- Setting: Ancient Egypt

Premiere
- Date: c.1619-20

The False One is a late Jacobean stage play by John Fletcher and Philip Massinger, though formerly placed in the Beaumont and Fletcher canon. It was first published in the first Beaumont and Fletcher folio of 1647.

This classical history tells of the meeting and romance of Julius Caesar and Cleopatra, and the betrayal and death of Pompey the Great at the hands of one of his own officers, the "false one" of the title.

== Date ==
Scholars date the play to the 1619–20 period, partly because of parallels with the political situation in Jacobean era England at the time. It was originally staged by the King's Men; the cast list provided in the second Beaumont and Fletcher folio of 1679 names John Lowin, Joseph Taylor, John Underwood, Nicholas Tooley, Robert Benfield, John Rice, Richard Sharpe, and George Birch. The presence of Taylor, who replaced Richard Burbage after Burbage's death in the spring of 1619, indicates a date after that time.

== Authorship ==
Given Fletcher's highly distinctive pattern of stylistic and textual preferences, scholars have found it fairly easy to distinguish the shares of the two authors in the play. Commentators from E. H. C. Oliphant to Cyrus Hoy have agreed that Massinger wrote Act I and Act V, while Fletcher wrote Acts II, III, and IV – the same division of labour as in The Elder Brother.

== Characters ==
- Julius Cæsar, Emperor of Rome.
- Ptolomy, King of Egypt.
- Achoreus, an honest Counsellor, Priest of Isis.
- Photinus, a Politician, minion to Ptolomy.
- Achillas, Captain of the Guard to Ptolomy.
- Septimius, a revolted Roman Villain.
- Labienus, a Roman Soldier, and Nuncio.
- Apollodorus, Guardian to Cleopatra.
- Antony,}
- Dolabella} Cæsar's Captains.
- Sceva, a free Speaker, also Captain to Cæsar.
- Guard.
- Three lame Soldiers.
- Servants.
- Cleopatra, Queen of Egypt. Cæsar's Mistress.
- Arsino, Cleopatra's Sister.
- Eros, Cleopatra's waiting Woman.

== Plot ==
The dramatists chose to portray only the beginning of the story of Caesar and Cleopatra in their play; they concentrate on the events of 48 BC. The play is set in Egypt; at its start, the Pharaoh Ptolemy XIII has sequestered his sister/wife/queen Cleopatra and has assumed sole rule of the kingdom, and the Battle of Pharsalia has not yet occurred. By the play's end, Caesar has deposed Ptolemy and placed Cleopatra in sole possession of the Egyptian crown. The play's Prologue specifically states that the work shows a virginal "Young Cleopatra...and her great Mind / Express'd to the height...." Some of the famous aspects of the story are reproduced in the play: Cleopatra has herself delivered to Caesar in Act III, though enclosed in a "packet" rather than rolled up in a rug.

The playwrights chose to concentrate much of their attention on the figure of Lucius Septimius, the Roman officer who betrayed, murdered, and decapitated Pompey the Great when Pompey landed in Egypt after his Pharsalia defeat (events depicted in Act II). Septimius is the "false one" of the title, and his prominence comes close to turning the work into a "villain play." Yet Septimius is portrayed as lacking any redeeming or sympathetic quality, making him a weak prop on which to mount a drama. The authors' choice in this matter may have been dictated by their desire to comment on contemporaneous political events; in this interpretation, the Pompey of the play represents Sir Walter Raleigh, executed in 1618, while the loathsome reprobate Septimius stands for Raleigh's primary accuser, Sir Lewis Stukeley.

Critics have seen the influence of Shakespeare's Antony and Cleopatra in The False One, and have suggested that the portrayal of Septimius was partially modelled on Shakespeare's Enobarbus. The False One is heavily dominated by political material, rather than dramatic realisations of its characters; for some critics, the split in the play's focus among Cleopatra, Caesar, and Septimius prevents the play from cohering into an effective dramatic whole.

== Related works ==
The collaborators' primary source for their play was the Pharsalia of Lucan.

The historical characters of the play – primarily Caesar and Cleopatra, but also Pompey and even Septimius – have attracted the attention of various dramatists. Apart from the famous works of Shakespeare and George Bernard Shaw, other instances can be noted. George Chapman's Caesar and Pompey, perhaps his most obscure play, may date from c. 1613. It was followed by Thomas May's The Tragedy of Cleopatra, Queen of Egypt (1626), Sir Charles Sedley's Antony and Cleopatra (1677), and John Dryden's All for Love (1678) – the last, one of Dryden's great successes. Similarly, Katherine Philips's translation of Pierre Corneille's La Mort de Pompée (1643) was a stage hit in London in 1663. As late as 1910, John Masefield treated Pompey and Septimius in his The Tragedy of Pompey the Great.
