= Leonard Digges (writer) =

16th-/17th-century English Hispanist and poet

Leonard Digges (/dɪɡz/; 1588 – 7 April 1635) was a Hispanist and minor poet, a younger son of the astronomer Thomas Digges (1545–95) and younger brother of Sir Dudley Digges (1583–1639). After his father's death in 1595, his mother married Thomas Russell of Alderminster, now in Warwickshire, who was named by William Shakespeare as one of the two overseers of his will. There are varying opinions about the extent to which the young Leonard Digges might have been influenced in his choice of profession by his stepfather's association with Shakespeare; disagreements about whether he was or was not personally acquainted with the playwright have in recent years eclipsed discussion of the work of Digges himself.

== Life ==
Leonard Digges matriculated at University College, Oxford in 1603, the year of his mother's remarriage, and graduated BA in 1606. This was followed by a period of study abroad. He may have traveled to Spain with fellow Hispanist James Mabbe, whom he knew from Oxford, for he wrote a note on the flyleaf of a book which Mabbe sent from Madrid to Will Baker, also a friend from Oxford days. The book was a copy of Rimas by Lope de Vega (published in 1613); it still survives, in the library of Balliol College. Digges's inscription reads:

Will Baker: Knowinge
that M^{r} Mab: was to
sende you this Booke
of sonets, w^{ch} with Spaniards
here is accounted of their
lope de Vega as in Englande
wee sholde of o^{r}: Will
Shakespeare. I colde not
but insert thus much to
you, that if you like
him not, you muste neuer
neuer reade Spanishe Poet

Leo:Digges

Anthony à Wood said of Leonard Digges that he "was esteemed by those who knew him in Univ.coll. a great master of the English language, a perfect understander of the French and Spanish, a good poet, and no mean orator". Wood says also that "upon his supplication made to the venerable convocation" of University College Oxford, Digges was made M.A. in 1626, "in consideration that he had spent many years in good letters in transmarine universities". He lived in the College from then until his death in 1635, and was buried in the College chapel (no longer standing).

== Works ==
Digges translated Claudian's The Rape of Proserpine (printed 1617). His translation of Varia fortuna de soldado Píndaro, by Gonzalo de Céspedes y Meneses, was published in 1622 as Gerardo, the Unfortunate Spaniard, and was used by John Fletcher as a source for his plays The Spanish Curate and The Maid in the Mill.

Digges's publisher was Edward Blount, a close friend of Mabbe's and one of the syndicate which published Shakespeare's First Folio in 1623. Digges and Mabbe both contributed prefatory poems to the Folio, as did Ben Jonson – also published by Blount. The previous year, Digges and Jonson had both contributed commendatory verses to a work translated by Mabbe and published by Blount. Commendatory verses by Digges were also included in an edition of Shakespeare's Poems, published by John Benson in 1640, five years after Digges had died. Freehafer suggests that since these verses refer to Shakespeare's plays rather than to his poems, they may have been intended for the Second Folio.
