= Robert Benfield =

British actor

Robert Benfield (died July 1649) was a seventeenth-century actor, noted for his longtime membership in the King's Men in the years and decades after William Shakespeare's retirement and death.

Nothing is known of Benfield's early life. He was most likely with the Lady Elizabeth's Men in 1613, and acted in their productions of Fletcher's The Coxcomb and the Fletcher/Massinger play The Honest Man's Fortune in that year. Benfield soon joined the King's Men, possibly to replace William Ostler, who died unexpectedly in December 1614. He acted in the company's production of John Webster's The Duchess of Malfi c. 1621.

He was a shareholder in the company by 1619, when he is listed in the renewed patent for the King's Men issued in that year. Benfield also eventually became a sharer in both the Globe and Blackfriars theatres, but only after a conflict: in 1635 he was one of three King's Men (the others were Thomas Pollard and Eliard Swanston) who petitioned the Lord Chamberlain, Philip Herbert, 4th Earl of Pembroke, for the right to buy shares from fellow King's Man John Shank and from Cuthbert Burbage.

Benfield was one of the ten King's Men who signed the dedication of the first Beaumont and Fletcher folio of 1647. In the 25 cast lists added to the second Beaumont and Fletcher folio of 1679, Benfield is mentioned 18 times:

- The Coxcomb
- The Custom of the Country
- The Double Marriage
- The False One
- The Honest Man's Fortune
- The Humorous Lieutenant
- The Island Princess
- The Knight of Malta
- The Little French Lawyer
- The Lovers' Progress
- The Mad Lover
- The Maid in the Mill
- The Pilgrim
- The Prophetess
- The Spanish Curate
- The Wild Goose Chase
- A Wife for a Month
- Women Pleased

Benfield's total equals those of Joseph Taylor and John Underwood, and is second only to John Lowin's 21.

Benfield played Junius Rusticus in The Roman Actor, Doctor Makewell in The Soddered Citizen, Ladislaus the King of Hungary in The Picture, Marcellus in Believe as You List, the King in The Deserving Favourite, and Antharis in The Swisser.

The parish records of St. Giles without Cripplegate in London, close to the Fortune Playhouse and the home of many actors in Benfield's era, record a few facts of Benfield's personal life. A son, James, was christened on 1 January 1628 (all dates new style). Benfield buried his wife Mary on 21 January 1629 and his son Bartholomew and daughter Elizabeth on 21 July and 1 August 1631 respectively. His own funeral occurred on 28 July 1649.

The twentieth-century scholar T. W. Baldwin developed a hypothesis that the King's Men assigned specific actors to specific stock roles: Taylor played "hero" parts, Lowin played "tyrant" parts, etc. In Baldwin's schema (which has been treated skeptically by many other commentators), Benfield's specialty lay in "dignitary" roles.
