= William Ecclestone =

English actor, member of the King's Men

William Ecclestone or Egglestone (fl. 1610 – 1623) was an actor in English Renaissance theatre, a member of Shakespeare's company the King's Men.

== Life ==
Nothing is known with certainty about Ecclestone's early life. There was an Eccleston living in Southwark in 1583, and a person of the same name lived in Swan Alley, near the Swan Theatre, in 1601; this may have been one (or two) of the actor's family. (No personal name is given in the records in either case.) A "William Eglestone" was married to an Ann Jacob on 20 February 1603 at St. Saviour's in Southwark; this might (or might not) have been the actor.

The man who definitely was the actor was with the King's Men in 1610 and 1611; he was part of the cast of their productions of Jonson's The Alchemist (1610) and Catiline (1611). In the latter year he left the King's Men for the Lady Elizabeth's Men; he became a sharer in that company and signed a bond with impresario Philip Henslowe on 29 August 1611, along with other actors who included Joseph Taylor and John Rice, two King's Men of the future. Ecclestone acted with that company in their production of The Honest Man's Fortune, most likely in 1613. Yet Ecclestone returned to the King's Men later in 1613, and was in their production of Fletcher's Bonduca that was performed around that time. He became a sharer in the King's Men sometime between 1614 and 1619.

In the 25 cast lists that were included in the second Beaumont and Fletcher folio of 1679, Ecclestone is mentioned in 12; in addition to the plays cited above, Ecclestone acted in:

- The Custom of the Country
- The Humorous Lieutenant
- The Island Princess
- The Laws of Candy
- The Little French Lawyer
- The Loyal Subject
- The Mad Lover
- The Sea Voyage
- The Spanish Curate
- Women Pleased

His is the seventh most frequently-mentioned name among the actors on the lists. Unfortunately, the specific roles Ecclestone filled in these plays are not known.

Ecclestone disappeared from the historical record in 1623, after he was mentioned in the last will and testament of Nicholas Tooley. Some commentators have speculated that Ecclestone might have been the "W. E." who wrote commendatory verses for the first quarto of Fletcher's The Wild Goose Chase in 1652; but the three-decade gap between 1623 and 1652 is problematic.
