= A Game at Chess =

1624 play by Thomas Middleton

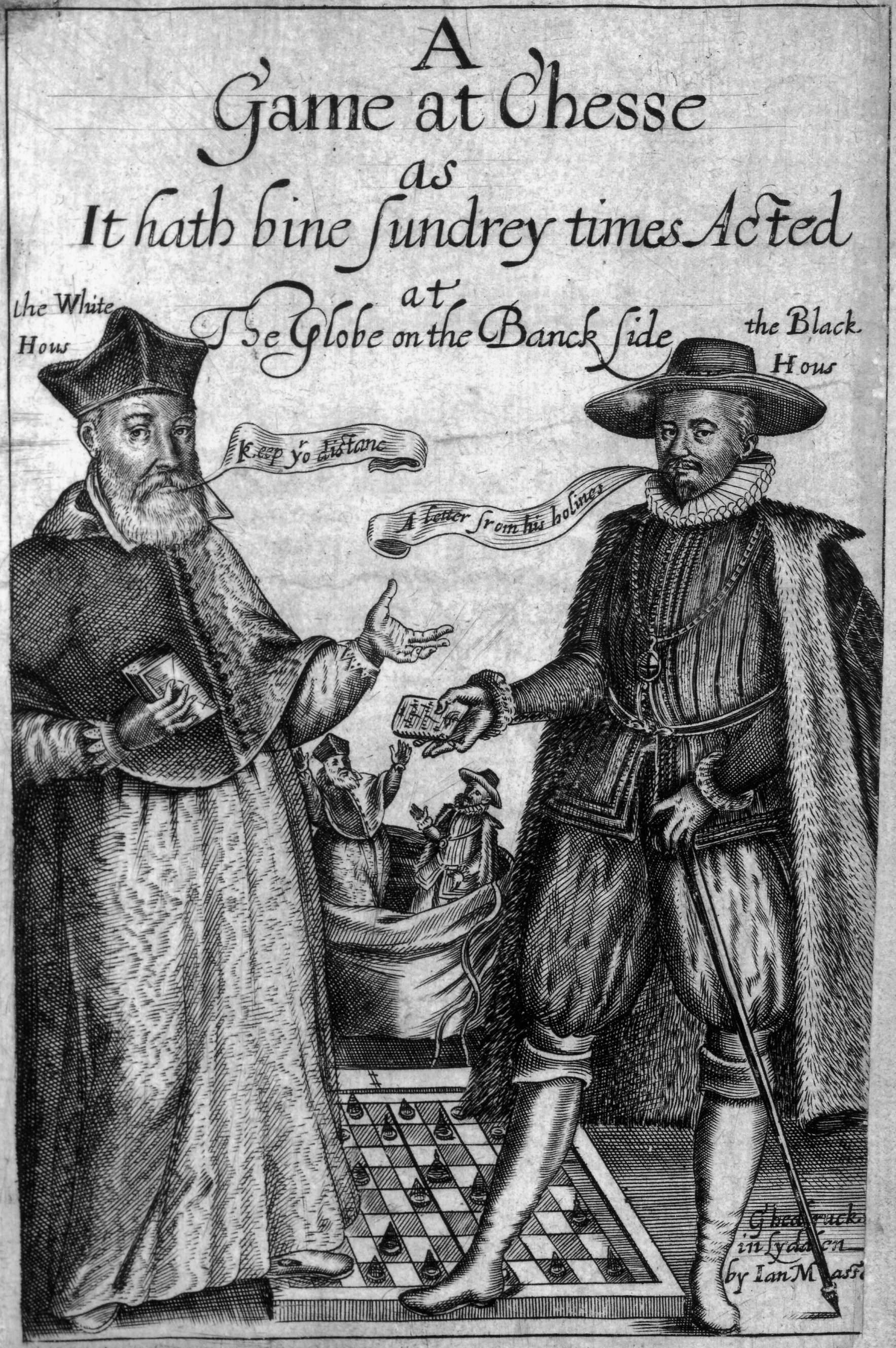
- Title page of an early printed edition. It depicts the Fat Bishop saying "Keep your distance", and the Black Knight tempting him with "A letter from his holiness". The characters' faces are caricatures of de Dominis and Gondomar.
- Original language: English
- Written by: Thomas Middleton
- Subject: Anglo-Spanish relations, Protestantism and Catholicism
- Genre: Satire, allegory
- Setting: A chessboard

Premiere
- Date: August 1624
- Place: Globe Theatre, London

A Game at Chess is a comic satirical play by Thomas Middleton, first staged in August 1624 by the King's Men at the Globe Theatre. The play is notable for its political content, dramatizing a conflict between Spain and England.

The plot takes the form of a chess match, and the play includes some genuine chess moves. Instead of personal names, the characters are known as the White Knight, the Black King, and so forth. Yet the play unmistakably alludes to Anglo-Spanish diplomacy under King James I of England, especially the failed marriage negotiation between Prince Charles and the Spanish Infanta Maria Anna of Spain. The play is satirical of King James, and it was shut down after only nine days.

== Historical context ==
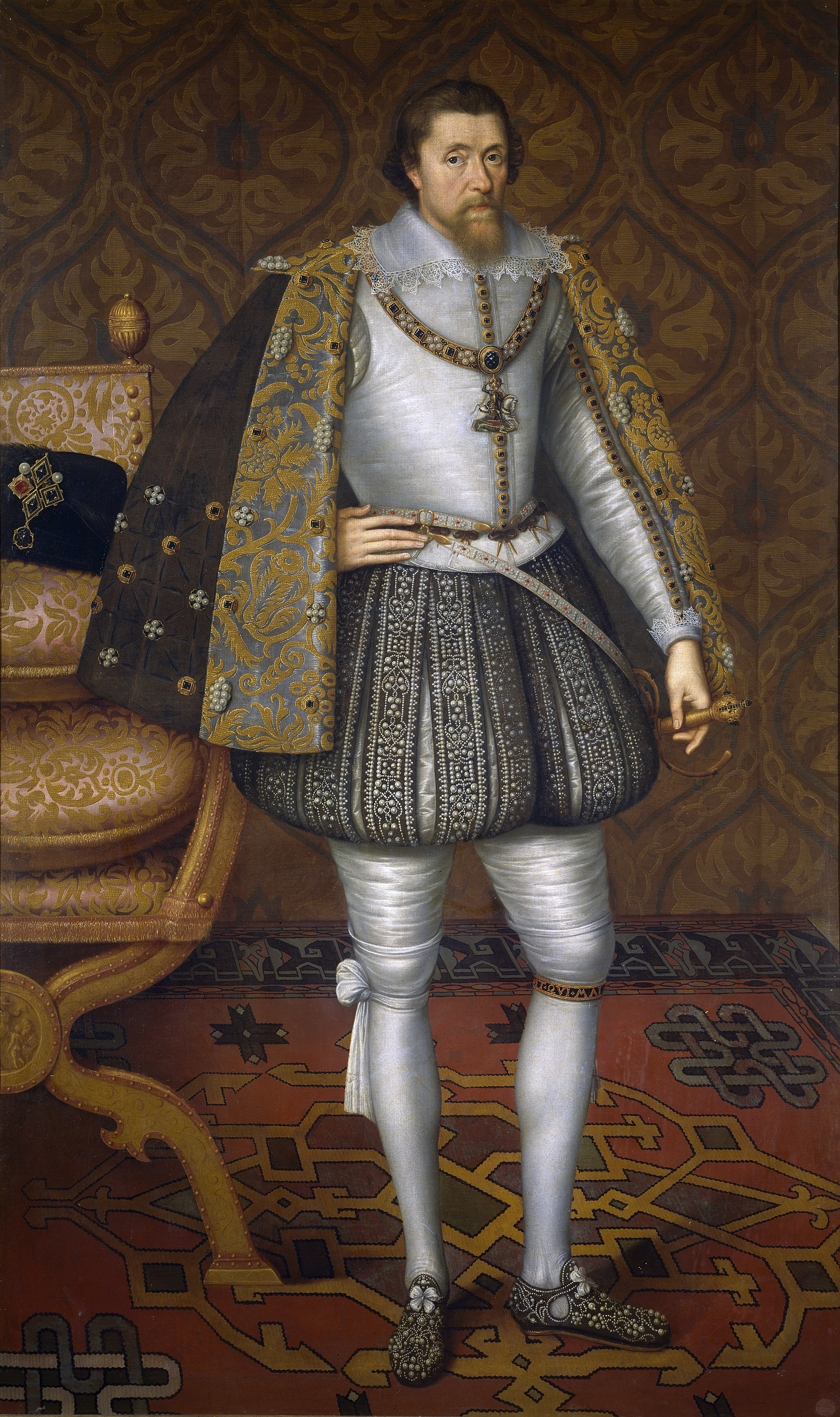
James I of England, model for the White King

A Game at Chess satirises historical events and figures of the early seventeenth century. Those depicted include members of the English court, the Spanish court, and prominent religious figures. James I, who reigned as King of England and Ireland from 1603 until his death in 1625, is depicted as the White King by Middleton. His son and successor, Prince Charles or Charles I, reigned after the play was written and is depicted as the White Knight. Elizabeth of Bohemia, James I's daughter, is also represented in the play as the White Queen. From Spain, Middleton depicts Philip IV, who reigned as King from 1621 to 1665, as the Black King. His sister Maria Anna of Spain is represented by the Black Queen. Don Diego Sarmiento de Acuña, Conde de Gondomar, the Spanish ambassador who was deeply unpopular in England, is depicted as the Black Knight. Religious figures depicted include Archbishop of Split, Marco Antonio de Dominis, or the Fat Bishop, who left the Roman Catholic Church to join the Anglican Church, later returning to Rome.

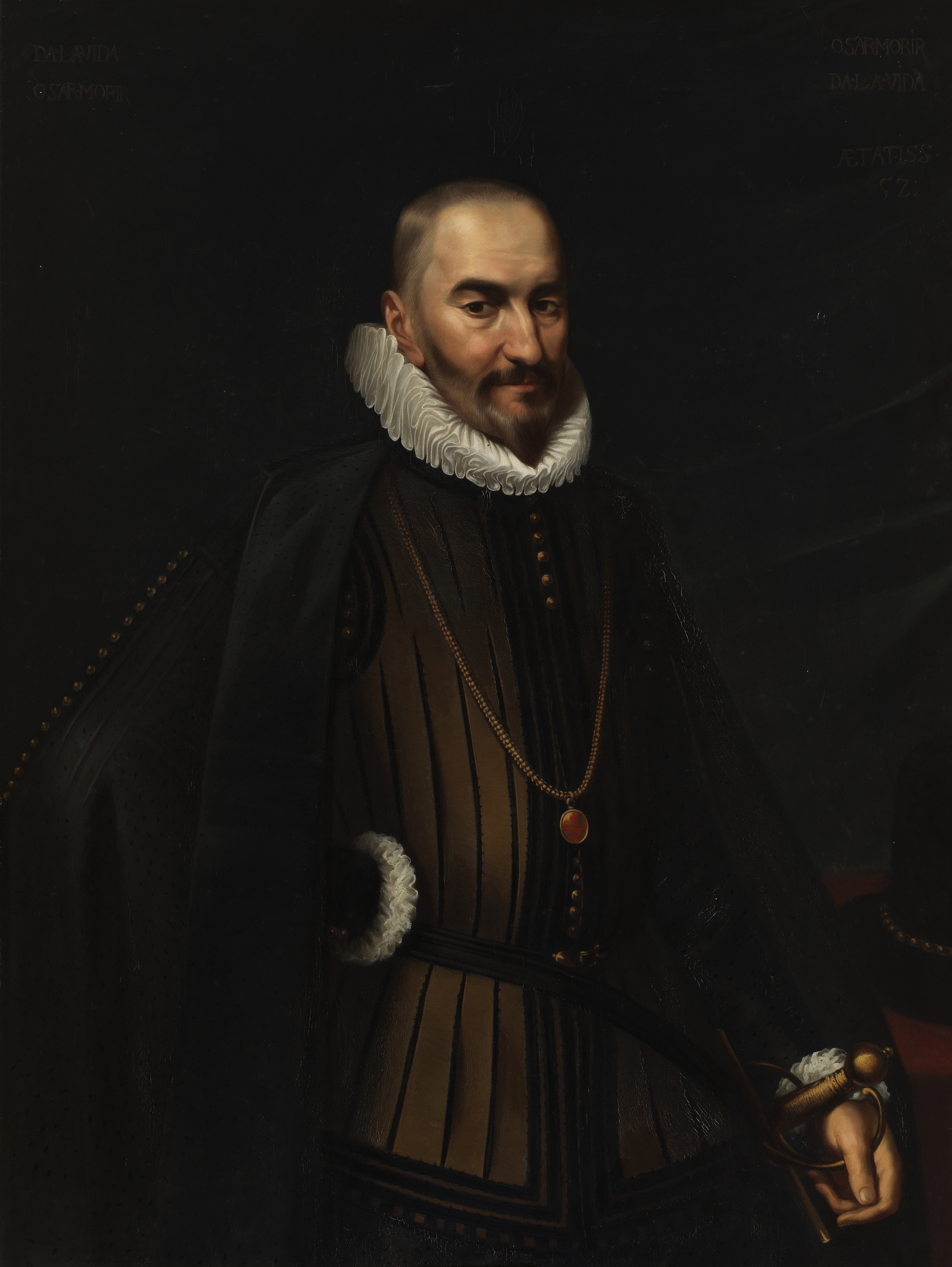
Diego Sarmiento de Acuña, conde de Gondomar, model for the Black Knight

The play takes place at a time of heightened tension between England and Spain, and it alludes to negotiations between the two countries to wed Prince Charles to the Spanish Infanta Maria Anna. The royal families hoped that the Spanish match would at the very least resolve some of the conflicts between England and Spain that still lingered after the Thirty Years' War. Additionally, James I hoped that a marriage alliance would restore his daughter Elizabeth to the Bohemian throne. Protestant English citizens were antagonistic toward the prospect of a marriage between their prince and the Catholic Infanta. Many feared for the safety of Prince Charles and the Duke of Buckingham when they travelled to Spain in February 1623 for the negotiations, and some feared that Charles would convert to Catholicism. Charles and Buckingham, who travelled in disguise, were unprepared to negotiate effectively with the Spanish, and they agreed to Spanish terms in order to return to England unharmed. The marriage did not go ahead, and the English public largely saw Charles's safe return and the failure of the negotiations as a victory against Spanish Catholics.

The play was stopped after nine performances (6–16 August, Sundays omitted), but not before it had become "the greatest box-office hit of early modern London". The Privy Council opened a prosecution against the actors and the author of the play on 18 August, on the grounds that it was then illegal to portray any modern Christian king onstage. The Globe Theatre was shut down by the prosecution, though Middleton was able to acquit himself by showing that the play had been approved by the Master of the Revels, Sir Henry Herbert. After James I's death, the play was printed in multiple editions, but Middleton never wrote another full play.

== Characters ==
Opening sequence

- Prologue
- Ignatius Loyola — Ghost of the founder of the Jesuits
- Error — An allegorical personification of religious heresy

White House

- White King — Alludes to King James I of England. Protestant leader of the White House.
- White King's Pawn — A spy for the Black House, most often identified as alluding to Lionel Cranfield, Earl of Middlesex.
- White Queen — Alludes to Elizabeth of Bohemia, daughter of King James
- White Queen's Pawn — A young virgin, former fiancée of the White Bishop's Pawn.
- White Knight — Alludes to Prince Charles, son of King James
- White Duke — Alludes to George Villiers, 1st Duke of Buckingham, favourite of King James and companion of Prince Charles
- Fat Bishop — Alludes to Marc Antonio de Dominis, Bishop of Spalato, a former bishop of the Black House who has recanted to join the White House. A comic role, written for the actor William Rowley.
- Fat Bishop's Pawn — A servant.
- White Bishop — Alludes to the Archbishop of Canterbury.
- White Bishop's Pawn — A Protestant minister, former fiancée of the White Queen's Pawn who has been castrated by the Black Knights's Pawn
- White Pawn — A servant pawn of unspecified allegiance.

Black House

- Black King — Alludes to King Philip IV of Spain. Catholic Leader of the Black House.
- Black Queen — Alludes to Maria Anna of Spain, proposed bride of the White Knight
- Black Queen's Pawn — A Jesuitess.
- Black Knight — Alludes to Diego Sarmiento de Acuña, conde de Gondomar, who was the Spanish ambassador to London.
- Black Knight's Pawn — A suitor of the White Queen's Pawn and castrator of the White Bishop's Pawn.
- Black Duke — Alludes to Gaspar de Guzmán, Count-Duke of Olivares, a favourite of Philip IV
- Black Bishop — Alludes to the Father-General of the Jesuits.
- Black Bishop's Pawn — A Jesuit.
- Black Jesting Pawn — A comic pawn of unspecified allegiance who teases a White Pawn. Does not appear in all versions of the play.
- Black Pawn — A servant pawn of unspecified allegiance.

== Synopsis ==
=== Prologue and Induction ===
The Prologue explains that the forthcoming stage play will be based on a game of chess, with some chess pieces representing men and states.

The Ghost of Ignatius Loyola (founder of the Jesuit Order) expresses surprise at finding a rare corner of the world where his order has not been established. His servant, Error, wakes up and says that he had been dreaming of a game of chess where "our side"—the Black House/Catholics—was set against the White House/Protestants. Ignatius says that he wants to see the dream, so he can observe his side's progress. The actors, as chess pieces, enter. Ignatius expresses contempt for his own followers and says that his true aim is to rule the entire world by himself.

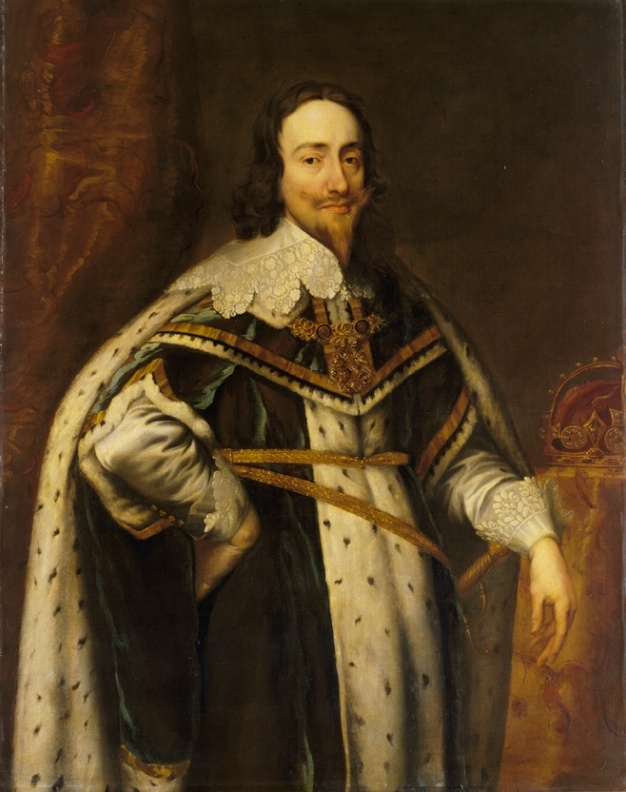
Charles, Prince of Wales, model for the White Knight

=== Act I ===
The Black Queen's Pawn, a Jesuitess, launches an attempt to convert and corrupt the virginal White Queen's Pawn. Faking tears, she says she pities the White Queen's Pawn, who she says will be "lost eternally", despite her beauty. The Jesuit Black Bishop's Pawn enters and continues the attempted conversion of the White Queen's Pawn, but is also struck by her beauty. He encourages her to confess her sins to him. The White Queen's Pawn confesses that she considered entering into a relationship with the White Bishop's Pawn, but he was castrated by the Black Knight's Pawn. The Black Bishop's Pawn questions the White Queen's Pawn closely about whether she experienced sexual desire, but she insists she did not. Hoping to seduce her, he gives her a book on the virtue of obedience, and she exits.

The Black Knight's Pawn and his castrated victim, the White Bishop's Pawn, exchange insults. The Black Knight Gondomar enters and notes that the "business of the universal monarchy" (i.e. the goal of world dominion by the Catholic Church) is going well, primarily because of his ability to trap souls through charm and deception. The White King's Pawn— a spy employed by the Black House— enters and issues a report. The Black Knight Gondomar calls the spy a fool after he leaves.

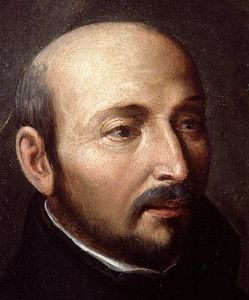
Ignatius Loyola appears as a ghost.

=== Act II ===
The White Queen's Pawn enters reading the manual given to her by the Jesuit Black Bishop's Pawn. As she reads to herself, the Black Bishop's Pawn enters and finds a letter addressed to him from the Black King. The Black King thanks the Jesuit for his work in corrupting the White Queen's Pawn, but states his desire to seduce the White Queen herself. The Jesuit Black Bishop's Pawn says he will help the King, but only after he has satisfied his own desire.

The White Queen's Pawn greets the Black Bishop's Pawn and begs him to give her an order to prove her virtue through obedience. He commands her to kiss him. When she refuses, he grows insistent, then attempts to rape her. A noise from offstage provides a distraction, and the White Queen's Pawn escapes.

Soon after, the Black Queen's Pawn re-enters and confronts the Black Bishop's Pawn about allowing the White Queen's Pawn to get away. Then, the Black Bishop enters with the Black Knight Gondomar. The Black Bishop scolds his pawn, claiming that news of the attempted rape will cause scandal for the Black House. The Black Knight makes plans for a coverup. He orders the Black Bishop's Pawn to flee and says he will falsify documents that make it look as though the pawn was not there when the incident took place. After the pawn flees through a trapdoor, the Black Knight Gondomar orders the burning of all of the pawn's files. The files contained records of various seductions and misdeeds that would implicate the Black House if discovered. Later, the Black Knight's Pawn enters and expresses remorse for castrating the White Bishop's Pawn.

The Fat Bishop of Spalato enters, gloating about his life. He has left the Black House and is now greatly favoured by the White House for writing books against his former faith-- but he complains the high offices he has been given are not enough. The Black Knight Gondomar and the Black Bishop enter. They curse the Fat Bishop and plot to convert him back to their side so they can take vengeance.

The White Queen's Pawn tells the White King that the Black Bishop's Pawn tried to rape her. The Black Knight Gondomar calls her a liar and produces the falsified documents. The White King finds the White Queen's Pawn guilty of slander. He rules that the Black House may discipline her as they see fit. The Black House decree that the White Queen's Pawn must fast for four days and kneel for twelve hours a day in a room filled with erotic images.

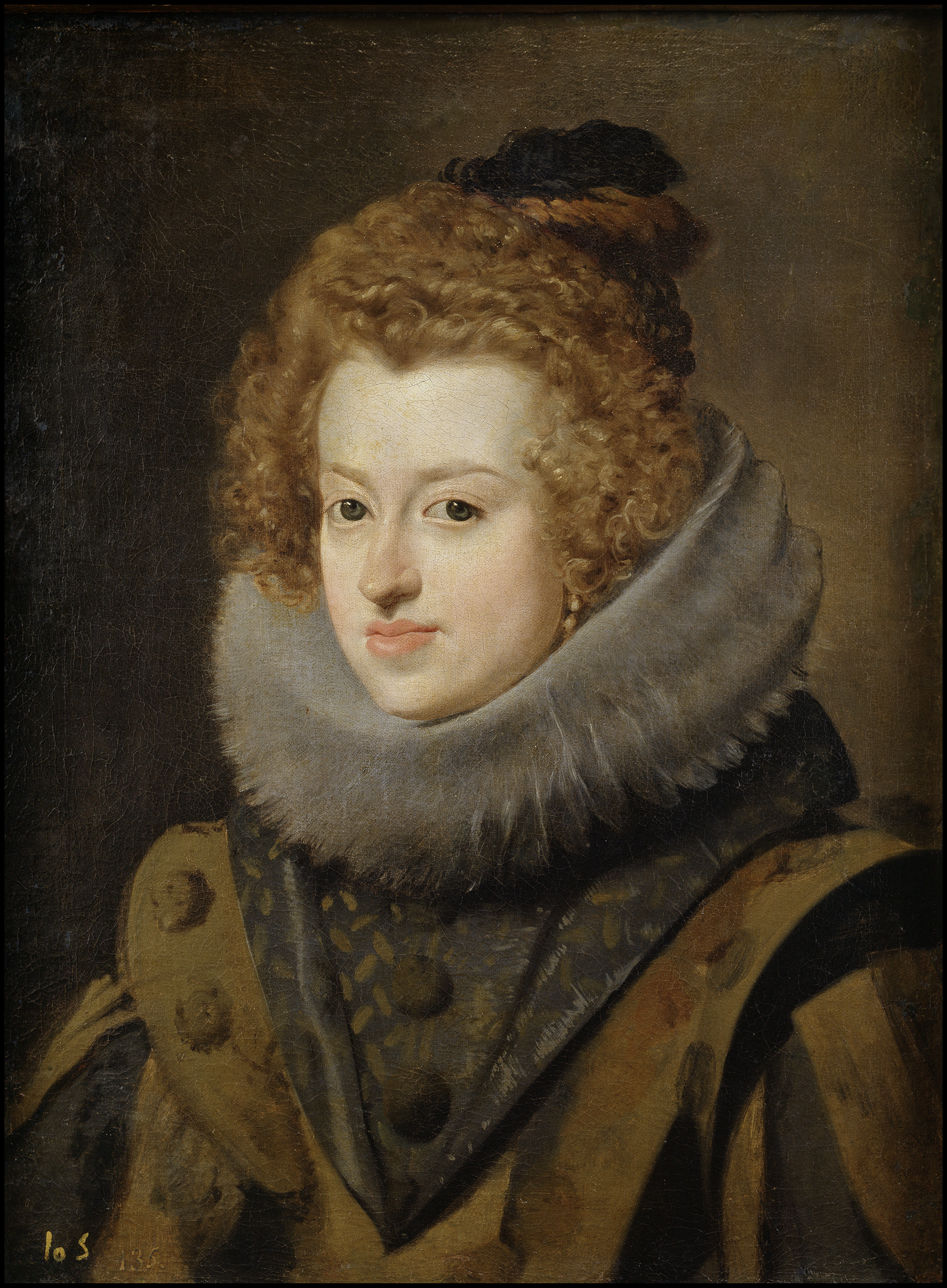
Maria Anna of Spain, model for the Black Queen

=== Act III ===
The Fat Bishop expresses dissatisfaction with the White House; he wants more titles and honours.

The Black Knight gives the Fat Bishop a (fake) letter from Rome. The letter suggests that the Fat Bishop could become the next Pope if he switches back to the Black House side. Excited by the letter, the Fat Bishop decides to burn all of the books he has written against the Black House, write a few books against the White House, and rejoin the Black House immediately.

The Black Knight's Pawn enters and tells the Black Knight that his plot has been foiled: upon investigation, the White Bishop's Pawn discovered that the Black Bishop's Pawn was, indeed, in town when the attempted rape of the White Queen's Pawn took place. She is acquitted and released.

Angling to regain trust, the Black Queen's Pawn praises the White Queen's Pawn's virtue, corroborates her account of the attempted rape, and claims responsibility for creating the distraction that enabled her escape during the attempted rape. The White Queen's Pawn is grateful.

The Black Knight reveals that the White King's Pawn is a spy and "captures" him.

The Fat Bishop reveals his change to the Black side and says he will immediately begin writing books against the White House. In an aside, the Black Knight says he will flatter the Fat Bishop for a while and betray him as soon as he outlives his usefulness.

The (recently captured) White King's Pawn asks the Black Knight how he will be rewarded for his service. Gondomar answers by sending him to "the bag" (a giant onstage bag for captured chess pieces, symbolic of Hell).

The Black Queen's Pawn tells the White Queen's Pawn that she has seen her future husband in a magic Egyptian mirror. The White Queen's Pawn is intrigued.

In a comic interlude full of sexual innuendo, a Black Jesting Pawn is taken from behind by a White Pawn, who is in turn taken from behind by another Black Pawn.

The Black Queen's Pawn takes the White Queen's Pawn to a room where the magic Egyptian mirror is kept. The Black Bishop's Pawn enters, disguised as the White Queen's Pawn's rich future husband (the scene is arranged so that the White Queen's Pawn is only able to see the Black Bishop's Pawn in the mirror). The White Queen's Pawn is fooled by the ruse.

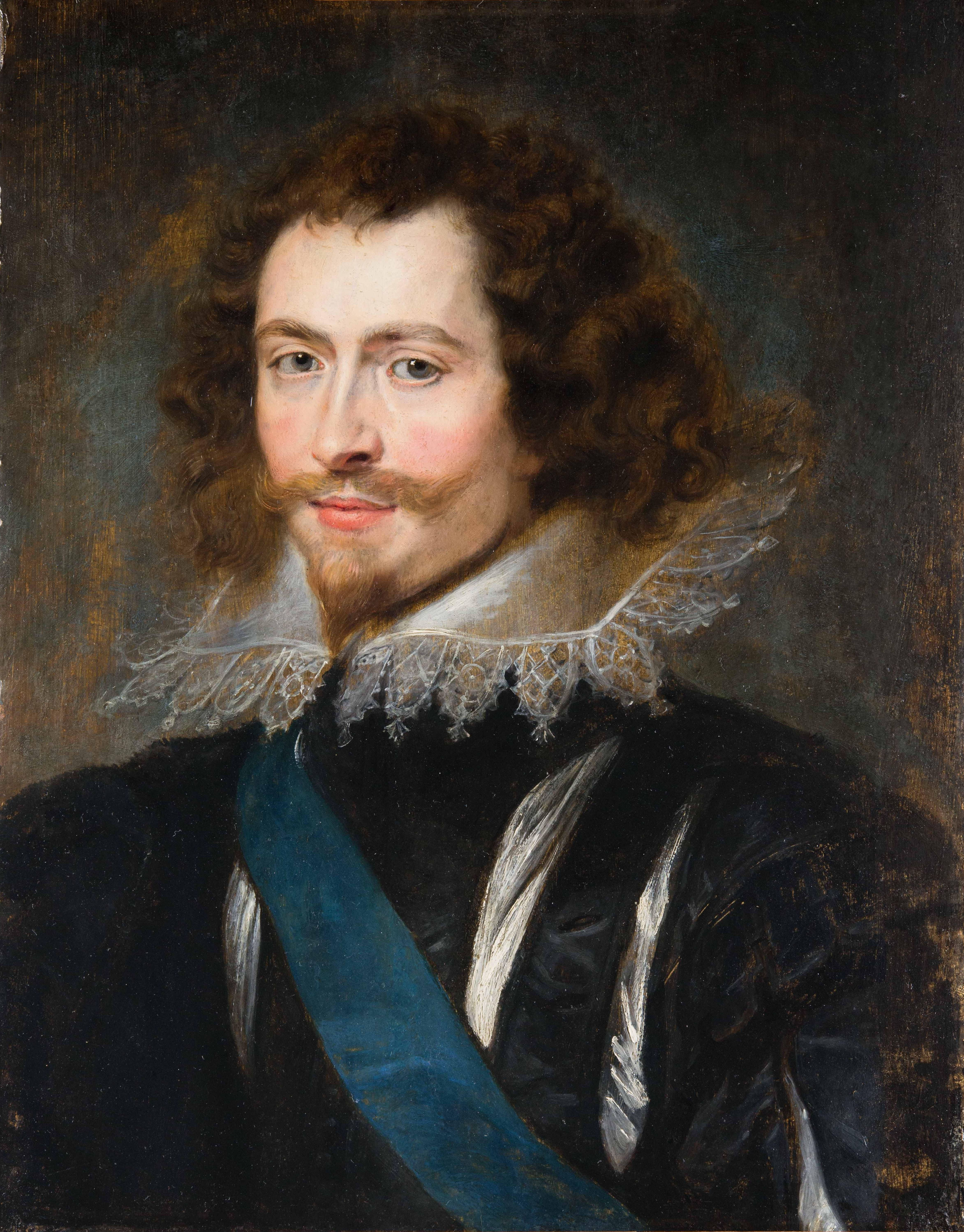
George Villiers, 1st Duke of Buckingham, model for the White Duke

=== Act IV ===
The Black Knight's Pawn still feels guilty for castrating the White Bishop's Pawn, so he asks the Black Bishop's Pawn for absolution. The Black Bishop's Pawn says he cannot absolve that sin; he must apply to the Fat Bishop himself.

The Black Queen's Pawn enters with the White Queen's Pawn. They notice the Black Bishop's Pawn, who is still disguised as the White Queen's Pawn's rich future husband, so the Black Queen's Pawn takes him offstage to the magic mirror to see if it is a match. When they return, the Black Bishop's Pawn swears he saw an image of the White Queen's Pawn when he looked in the mirror and suggests that they have sex that very night. The White Virgin protests that she cannot have sex until they are properly married. The Black Bishop's Pawn is frustrated, but the Black Queen's Pawn tells him not to worry—she will manage everything.

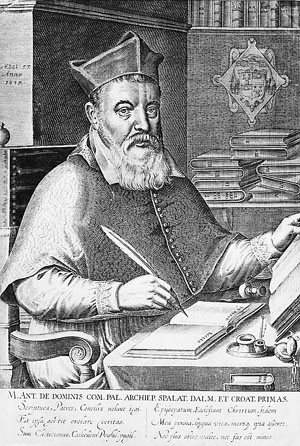
Markantun de Dominis, model for the Fat Bishop

The Black Knight's Pawn begs the Fat Bishop for absolution. The Fat Bishop and the Black Knight look through the official book of penances (and financial prices) for the pardoning of sins, but they cannot find an entry for having gelded another man. The Fat Bishop comments that it would be easier to pardon the Pawn for murder than for castration. The distressed Black Knight's Pawn finds a way out of his dilemma: he will kill the White Bishop's Pawn so that he can then be forgiven.

The Black Queen's Pawn orchestrates a "bed trick"; in a dark room, she tricks the Black Bishop's Pawn into having sex with her by leading him to believe that he is going to bed with the White Queen's Pawn. The White Queen's Pawn remains safely unmolested.

The White Knight and the White Duke travel to the Black House, pretending to be interested in converting. The Black Knight welcomes the two and tells the White Knight that he will do anything to please him. The Fat Bishop attempts to capture the unprotected White Queen, but his attack is prevented by the White Bishop and the White King, who capture the Fat Bishop and send him to "the bag".

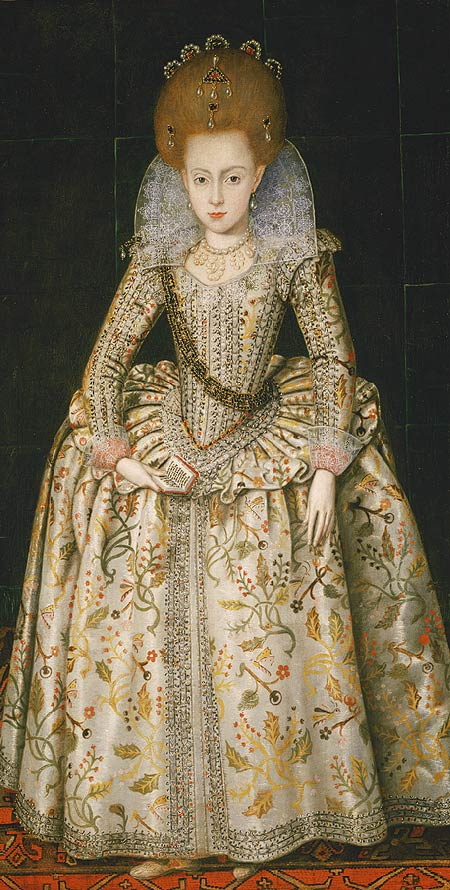
Elizabeth of Bohemia, model for the White Queen

=== Act V ===
The White Knight and the White Duke enter the Black court, which is decorated with statues and candles. To entertain the honoured guests, a Latin oration is spoken and a song is sung during which the statues seem to move by themselves and the candles light themselves.

The Black Bishop's Pawn— no longer in his "rich future husband" disguise— tells the White Queen's Pawn mockingly that he is the man with whom she has spent the night. The White Virgin insists that she spent the night alone. The Black Queen's Pawn enters and reveals her bed trick: that it was she with whom the Black Bishop's Pawn spent the night. The Black Queen's Pawn reveals that in the past, she was sexually abused by the Black Bishop's Pawn, and that she has done all this to orchestrate his capture. She knows she will be captured too, but she doesn't care. The White Bishop's Pawn and the White Queen capture the Black Bishop's Pawn and the Jesuitess Black Queen's Pawn and send them to the bag.

The Black Knight's Pawn tries to murder the White Bishop's Pawn, but his attempt is foiled by the White Queen's Pawn. She captures him and sends him to the bag, then leaves, resolved to live a single and celibate life.

The White Knight and the White Duke have just finished a decadent meal at the Black court. The Black Knight delivers a long speech talking about the extravagance of their mode of life.

The White Knight implies that he is interested in changing sides, but worries that his sins would transgress the Black House's rules. The Black Knight encourages the White Knight to confess his sins. The White Knight confesses to being ambitious; the Black Knight counters that the Black House loves ambition since they desire to rule the world. The White Knight confesses to being covetous; the Black Knight tells him their whole institution is built on financial gain. The White Duke confesses to being lecherous; the Black Knight says that is commonplace within the Black House too. Lastly, the White Knight confesses to being "an arch-dissembler". The Black Knight, King and Queen call him their brother and proclaim that everything they do is falsehood. As soon as these crimes have been admitted, the White Knight gives them "checkmate by discovery... the noblest mate of all." Thus, the game is won. The White King appears with the rest of the White House court; all of the remaining Black House pieces are sent to the bag.

== Texts ==
A Game at Chess survives in nine different texts, each of which has its own unique characteristics. Gary Taylor thus calls the play "the most complicated editorial problem in the entire corpus of early modern drama, and one of the most complicated in English literature". The play is unique in that it exists in more 17th-century manuscripts than it does printed editions (six extant manuscripts compared to three printed editions). Of the manuscripts, one is an authorial holograph, and three are the work of Ralph Crane, a professional scribe who worked for the King's Men in this era and who is thought to have prepared some of the play texts for the First Folio of Shakespeare's plays.

The manuscript and printed forms of the text present significant orthographical differences as well as some differences in the plot and characters' names. For example, early manuscript forms of the play lack the Prologue and use ambiguous speech prefixes, referring to characters by the initials of their chess pieces rather than by name.

There are two major studies of the relationship between the texts: that of T. H. Howard Hill (1995), and Gary Taylor (2007); the studies give different names to the texts.

Name (Howard-Hill)	Name (Taylor)	Current location	Provenance	Created by	Notes
Archdall (Ar.)	Crane^{1}	Folger Shakespeare Library	Once owned by Irish antiquary Mervyn Archdall	Ralph Crane (scribe)	Believed to be the earliest form of the play
Bridgewater-Huntington (B-H)	Bridgewater	Huntington Library	Bought from the Earl of Ellesmere's collection at Bridgewater House	Unidentified scribe	
Lansdowne (Ln.)	Crane^{2}	British Library	Lansdowne Collection	Ralph Crane (scribe)	
Malone (Ma.)	Crane^{3}	Bodleian Library	Formerly owned by William Hammond (d.1635) and John Pepys (d.1652)	Ralph Crane (scribe)	
First Quarto (Q1)	Okes	n/a	n/a	Nicholas Okes (printer)	
Second Quarto (Q2)	Okes^{2}	n/a	n/a	Nicholas Okes (printer)	A reprint of Q1
Third Quarto (Q3)	Mathews/Allde	n/a	n/a	Augustine Mathews and Edward Allde (printers)	
Rosenbach (Rs.)	Rosenbach	Folger Shakespeare Library	Once owned by A.S.W. Rosenbach	Two unidentified scribes	
Trinity (Tr.)	Middleton^{T}	Trinity College, Cambridge	Perh. Patrick Young, librarian to King James I	Thomas Middleton (author)	

== Criticism and interpretation ==
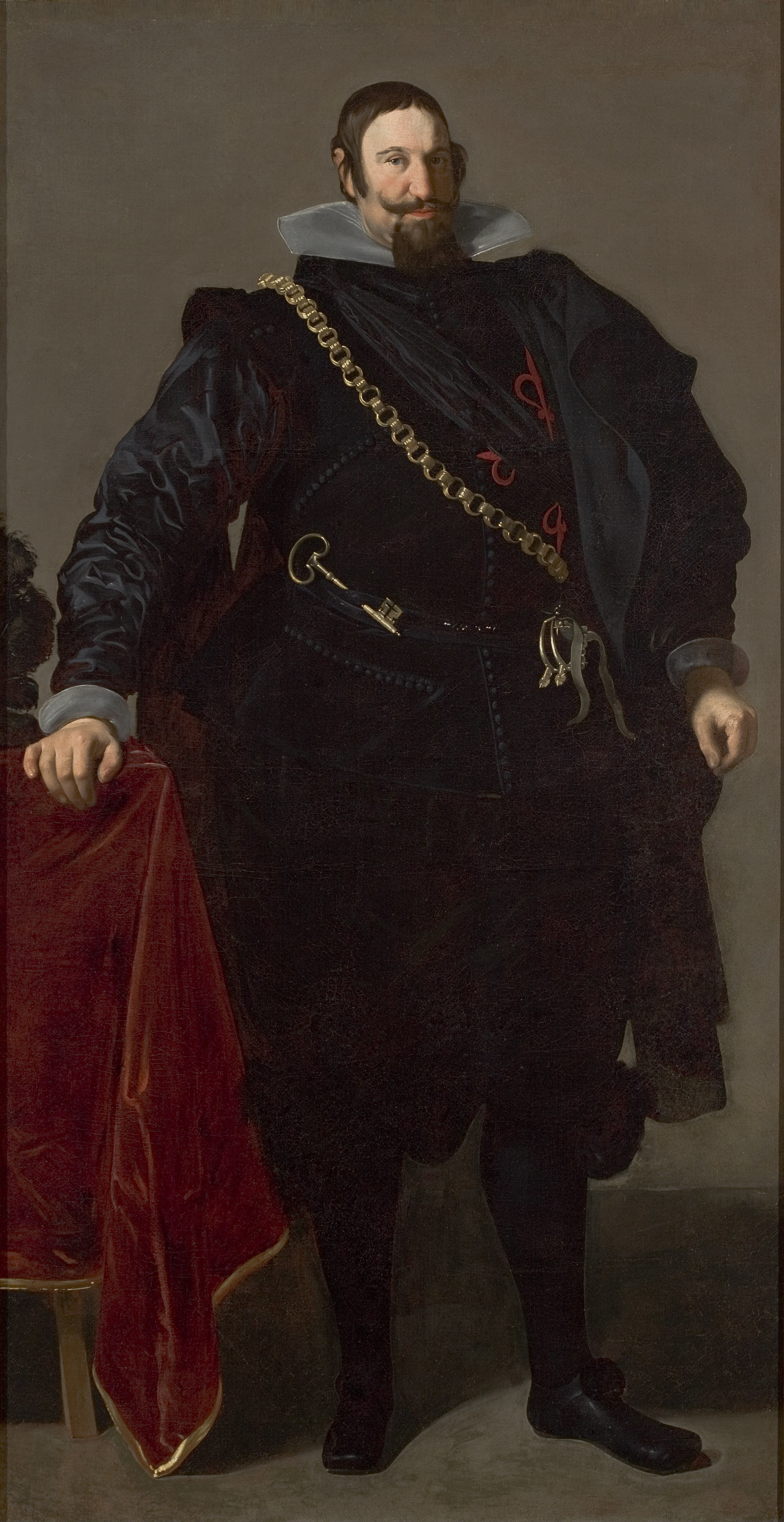
Gaspar de Guzmán, Count-Duke of Olivares, model for the Black Duke, as portrayed by Velasquez in 1624

=== Politics and religion ===
Much of the criticism and interpretation of A Game at Chess has focused on its political, religious and allegorical content. Scholars agree that Middleton antagonizes Spanish Catholics and the Jesuit order by portraying them as schemers intent on the domination of the world. The Black Queen's Pawn serves as an example, representing a domestic threat to English women, especially virgins. Overall, Middleton uses black and white imagery to portray Spanish Catholics as evil ("black") in their ambitions to convert the pure English nation ("white") to Catholicism.

Thomas Cogswell has argued that the play enjoyed success not only because of its humorous and critical portrayal of Spain, but also because it celebrates the Duke of Buckingham and Prince Charles as heroes. Cogswell argues that Middleton does not advance the agenda of his patron, the Earl of Pembroke, by criticizing Buckingham. Instead, the play was an attempt to reinforce public support for Charles and Buckingham.

Howard Hill has suggested that the play is not a result of any specific statecraft, but merely takes advantage of the anti-Spanish and anti-Catholic sentiments of the time. However, other scholars see the play as participating in the agenda of Parliamentary Puritans and their Continental counterparts, mainly the Dutch, to galvanize the masses against the Spanish-Catholic hegemony. Gary Taylor has argued that the play was subversive insofar as Middleton's Puritan ideology was in opposition to the Church of England and also the political establishment, specifically King James I of England. For Taylor, the play was meant to be a pointed critique of Catholic ideals and its authoritative control over its subjects' lives. Yet Taylor also argues that the text "depends upon what it rejects", that is, "obedience, confession, dissembling, totalizing power, and sexual mismatching".

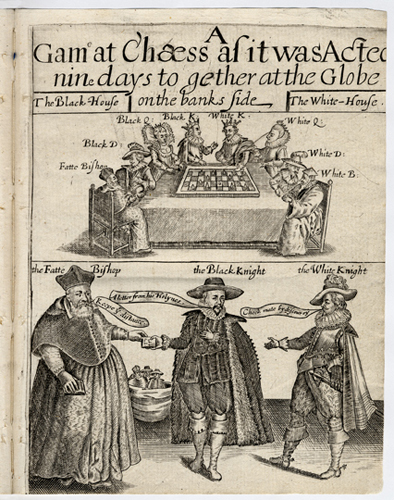
Title page of an early printed edition

=== Chess allegory ===
Roussel Sargent has argued that Middleton uses chess allegory to elude censorship, allowing him to avoid explicitly identifying his characters with political figures. Portraying the events of the play as a chess match affords Middleton flexibility: he can create completely fictitious characters, and he can also base characters upon political figures. Chess is also a means of portraying the conflicts between Catholic Spain and Protestant England in terms of two clearly opposing sides.

Scholars have claimed that Middleton's chess allegory also has a racist aspect, in that the difference between England and Spain in cast in terms of skin color. The blackness of the Spanish side associates darker complexion with evil, while the whiteness of England associates lighter complexion with purity.

=== Influence on the public ===
Musa Gurnis has observed that scholars have neglected to observe the impact of the play's dramaturgy upon audiences. Gurnis argues that the play not only arouses anti-Catholic sentiment, but also encourages the audience to actively persecute Catholic minorities outside of the theatre. Stephen Wittek notes that plays including A Game at Chess shaped and contributed to the making of a public sphere, as audience members were able to bond over shared experiences and partake in a shared discourse.

== Bibliography ==
- Aaron, Melissa. (2003). Global Economics: A History of the Theatre Business, the Chamberlain's/King's Men, and Their Plays, 1599–1642. University of Delaware Press.
- Beneš, Jakub S. (8 December 2016), "Narrating Socialism in Habsburg Austria", Workers and Nationalism, Oxford University Press, ISBN 9780198789291, retrieved 26 April 2019.
- Bicks, Caroline (2009). "Staging the Jesuitess in 'A Game at Chess'". Studies in English Literature, 1500–1900. 49 (2)
- Cogswell, Thomas (1984). Thomas Middleton and the Court, 1624: "A Game at Chess in Context". Huntington Library Quarterly. 47 (4). doi:10.2307/3817364, 10.2307/3817364
- Dutton, Richard (2004). Milling, Jane; Thomson, Peter (eds.). "Thomas Middleton's A Game at Chess : a case study". The Cambridge History of British Theatre. Cambridge: Cambridge University Press. doi:10.1017/CHOL9780521650403.018, 10.1017/CHOL9780521650403.018.
- Gurnis, Musa (2018). Mixed Faith and Shared Feeling: Theater in Post-Reformation London. Philadelphia, Pennsylvania. ISBN 9780812250251. OCLC 1010542474.
- Heinemann, Margot (March 1975)."Middleton's A Game at Chess: Parliamentary-Puritans and Opposition Drama". English Literary Renaissance. 5 (2). doi:10.1111/j.1475-6757.1975.tb01321.x, 10.1111/j.1475-6757.1975.tb01321.x. ISSN 0013-8312.
- Howard-Hill, T. H. (1991). "Political Interpretations of Middleton's 'A Game at Chess' (1624)". The Yearbook of English Studies. 21. doi:10.2307/3508494, 10.2307/3508494. ISSN 0306-2473.
- Keenan, Siobhan (2014). "Acting Companies and Their Plays in Shakespeare's London". London: Arden.
- Middleton, Thomas (1966). Harper, J.W. (ed.). A Game at Chess. London: Ernest Behn Ltd.
- Middleton, Thomas (2007). Taylor, Gary; Lavagnino, John (eds.). Thomas Middleton : the collected works. Oxford: Clarendon Press. ISBN 9780198185697. OCLC 163311360.
- "Middleton, Thomas (1570?–1627)". Oxford Dictionary of National Biography. Oxford University Press. Retrieved 22 April 2019.
- Redworth, Glyn. (2003). The Prince and the Infanta: The Cultural Politics of the Spanish Match. New Haven: Yale University Press. ISBN 0300101988. OCLC 52946694.
- Sargent, Roussel (1971). "Theme and Structure in Middleton's 'A Game At Chess'". The Modern Language Review. 66 (4). Retrieved 22 April 2019
- Taylor, Gary (Spring 1994). "Forms of Opposition: Shakespeare and Middleton". English Literary Renaissance. 24.
- Taylor, Gary; Lavagnino, John, eds. (2007). Thomas Middleton and Early Modern Textual Culture: A Companion to the Collected Works. 2. Oxford: Oxford University Press. doi:10.1093/actrade/9780198185703.book.1, 10.1093/actrade/9780198185703.book.1. ISBN 9780198185703.
- Wilson, Edward; Turner, Olga (1949). "The Spanish Protest Against "A Game at Chesse"". The Modern Language Review. 44
- Wittek, Stephen (2015). "Middleton's A Game at Chess and the making of a theatrical public". Studies in English Literature. 55(2).
