= The Humorous Lieutenant =

Stage play by John Fletcher

The Humorous Lieutenant, also known as The Noble Enemies, Demetrius and Enanthe, or Alexander's Successors, is a Jacobean era stage play, a tragicomedy written by John Fletcher. Highly praised by critics, it has been called "Fletcher's best comedy."

The drama was initially published in the first Beaumont and Fletcher folio of 1647.

== Date and performance ==
The second Beaumont/Fletcher folio of 1679 provides a cast list for the original King's Men's production, which includes Henry Condell, Joseph Taylor, John Lowin, William Ecclestone, Richard Sharpe, John Underwood, Robert Benfield—and Thomas Pollard, the comic actor who filled the title role. This is the only cast list that includes both Taylor and Condell; Taylor joined the company in the spring of 1619, to replace Richard Burbage after his death in March of that year; and Condell is thought to have retired not long after—which appears to date the play fairly securely to 1619.

== Manuscript ==
In addition to the printed texts in the two folios, the play exists in a manuscript version, a presentation copy prepared by the professional scribe Ralph Crane for Sir Kenelm Digby. Crane sent the MS. to Digby on 27 November 1625. In Crane's text, the play is longer by some 70 lines; the printed texts provide a stage version trimmed for acting. The MS. is titled Demetrius and Enanthe, and attributes the play to Fletcher alone—a verdict that is generally accepted, since Fletcher's distinctive stylistic profile is continuous through the play. The MS. has been called "the most beautiful example of Crane's calligraphy that we have."

== After 1642 ==
Comic material from the play was adapted into a droll during the Interregnum period. Like many plays in Fletcher's canon, The Humorous Lieutenant was revived at the start the Restoration era, in 1660. When the new Theatre Royal at Drury Lane opened on 8 April 1663, The Humorous Lieutenant was the first play staged, and ran for twelve nights in a row—highly unusual in the repertory system of the time. The play remained popular and was performed repeatedly, in various adaptations, into the early eighteenth century. Adapted forms of the play were published in 1697 and 1717, while the manuscript text was first printed by Alexander Dyce in 1830.

== The plot ==
The Humorous Lieutenant has no known source in the previous literature, and seems to be that rare item in English Renaissance drama: an original plot. It is set in the ancient Middle East after the death of Alexander the Great, and features the major historical figures of the era: Antigonus, his son Demetrius, and Seleucus, Ptolemy, and Lysimachus. The plot centers on the love between Demetrius and an obscure young woman named Celia—who at the end of the play turns out to be Enanthe, the daughter of King Seleucus and so a suitable match for a prince.

The title character is the play's main comic relief: an otherwise-unnamed lieutenant who is capable of fighting ferociously in battle but is a profound hypochondriac the rest of the time. He is "humorous" in the seventeenth-century sense of the word: his bodily humours are out of balance.
