= John Shank =

English actor (died 1636)

John Shank (also spelled Shanke or Shanks) (died January 1636) was an actor in English Renaissance theatre, a leading comedian in the King's Men during the 1620s and 1630s.

== Early career ==
By his own testimony, Shank began his stage career with Pembroke's Men and Queen Elizabeth's Men. "Presumably the Pembroke's company in question was that of 1597–1600, and the Queen Elizabeth's Men the travelling company of the latter years of the reign" – that is to say, the later years of Elizabeth I.

Shank was with Prince Henry's Men by 1610, and was a sharer in the company (that is, a partner who shared in the profits rather than a hired man) by 1613. Shank seems to have fulfilled the function that clowns had filled at least since the time of Richard Tarleton: he was a "jigging clown" who sang and danced the jig that concluded each performance.

In the controversy surrounding the Prince's Men's production of The Roaring Girl in 1611, Shank seems to have temporarily lost his jigging function when "lewd jigs, songs and dances" were suppressed by the Middlesex justices in 1612.

== Maturity ==
Sometime between 1613 and 1619, Shank joined the King's Men; he is listed as a sharer in the company in 1619, and is present in the records of that company till his death. He was noted for playing the Curate in their 1624 revival of Beaumont and Fletcher's The Scornful Lady. His role as Hilario in the King's Men's 1629 production of Massinger's The Picture shows that Shank played comic "thin-man" roles for the company – what his own era called the "lean fool."

This was a standard part of the King's Men's style of theatre; in the previous generation of Shakespeare and Burbage, hired man John Sinkler played thin-man roles like Pinch in The Comedy of Errors and Shadow in Henry IV, Part 2. Shank seems to have been cast in the same dramatic function within the company as Sinkler. Shank may have joined the King's Men as early as 1613; the company was licensed to perform something called Shank's Ordinary, probably a jig, on 16 March 1614.

Shank played the clown role in John Clavell's The Soddered Citizen in 1630, and the servant Petella in the 1632 revival of John Fletcher's The Wild Goose Chase.

=== Training boy actors ===
Shank also played an important role in training the company's apprentices, the boy actors who played the female roles in plays prior to the advent of stage actresses in the Restoration era. Shank trained Thomas Pollard, Thomas Holcomb, John Honyman, Nicholas Burt, and John Thompson, who were significant members of the company in the late Jacobean and Caroline eras. (Later, Shank would claim that he spent £40 on Thompson, and £200 on his apprentices overall.) Shank is known to have played at least one female role himself in these years, the minor part of the servant Petella in the company's 1632 revival of Fletcher's The Wild Goose Chase. This suggests that Shank taught boys and young men to play stage females based at least in part on his own experience.

== Controversy ==
When veteran King's Man John Heminges died in 1630, his shares in the company's two theatres, the Globe and the Blackfriars, passed to his son William Heminges. Between 1633 and 1635, the younger Heminges sold the three shares that he owned in the Globe (the theatre was divided into sixteen shares total), and his two shares in the Blackfriars (out of a total of eight), to Shank, who paid Heminges £506. The sales may have been clandestine, since ownership of the theatre shares was a sensitive subject within the company. When the shareholder system was established for the Globe (1599) and the Blackfriars (1608), most of the shareholders were the company's actors. With the passage of time, a majority of those shares passed to the widows and heirs of the original actors; younger members of the company were left out of the profitable system.

In 1635, Eliard Swanston, Robert Benfield, and Thomas Pollard, three actors in the King's Men who were sharers in the company but not "householders" or shareholders in the theatres, petitioned the Lord Chamberlain – then Philip Herbert, 4th Earl of Pembroke – for the right to purchase shares in the theatres. Pembroke ordered Shank and the Burbage family to sell shares to the three actors; but Shank and Cuthbert Burbage both protested the ruling. The dispute generated a back-and-forth documentation, sometimes called the "sharers' papers," that has provided subsequent generations of scholars and researchers with important data on the theatre business of the age. Shank complained that he and the three actors could not reach acceptable terms for a sale, and that they prevented him from performing with the company. The dispute seems to have injected a significant degree of bitterness into the last year of Shank's life.

== Death ==
Local records in London show that for many years, Shank and his family lived in Golden Lane in the parish of St. Giles, Cripplegate (the same parish as Cuthbert Burbage and King's Man Nicholas Tooley). Records of the baptisms and burials of several of his children exist between the years 1610 and 1629. The exact date of Shank's death in unknown, though his funeral was held on 27 January 1636.

Shank's 1635 last will and testament required the company to pay his widow £50 as his share of the value of their costumes and plays. The will identifies Shank as a "citizen and weaver of London" as well as "one of his Majesty's servants the players." Professional actors sometimes maintained formal membership in one of the city's guilds so that they could lawfully bind apprentices to contracts – something that actors, as retainers in noble households, could not do under the prevailing legal system. John Heminges, for example, was a member of the grocers' guild throughout his life; James Burbage was a member of the carpenters' guild, while John Lowin and Robert Armin were goldsmiths' guild members.

Given Shank's role in training boy players for the company, he likely pursued a similar arrangement. Yet the will (one commentator has called it "a masterpiece of acrimony") also specified that the company owed him £16 20s. for two gowns; Shank may have had some role in providing the costumes of the troupe.

== On the modern stage ==
In an April 2000 production at the Albery Theatre, Shank was played by Michael Gambon in Nicholas Wright's comedy Cressida. Set in 1635, near the end of the era in which female roles were played by boys, Wright's play shows Shank coaching a boy actor in the role of Cressida while giving the company a masterclass in acting as a craft.
