= Samuel Gilburne =

Samuel Gilburne (fl. 1605, d. after 1623) was an Elizabethan actor who is listed as one of the "Principall Actors" in the prefatory material of the First Folio of William Shakespeare's plays. Gilburne is named as a former apprentice to Augustine Phillips, another member of Shakespeare's company, in Phillips' will dated 4 May 1605, in which Gilburne is bequeathed 40 shillings, Phillips's "mouse-colored" velvet hose, his black taffeta suit and white taffeta doublet, his purple cloak, his sword and dagger, and his bass viol. A copy of the First Folio held at the Folger Shakespeare Library has a signature thought to be Gilburne's.
