= Thomas Pollard (actor) =

17th-century English actor

Thomas Pollard (1597 – 1649×1655) was an actor in the King's Men – a prominent comedian in the acting troupe of William Shakespeare and Richard Burbage.

Thomas Pollard was christened on 11 December 1597 in Aylesbury, Buckinghamshire. His date of death is not known.

== Career ==
Pollard starting as a boy player specializing in women's roles. He was trained by John Shank, a noted comic actor; and after he matured and left female roles behind, Pollard acquired his own reputation as a gifted comic performer. His most notable part was the title role in Fletcher's The Humorous Lieutenant. He had the comical role of Timentes the cowardly general in Arthur Wilson's The Swisser.

He played Silvio in Webster's The Duchess of Malfi, in the productions of c. 1614 and c. 1621. He appeared in Shakespeare's Henry VIII, probably in the 1628 revival at the Globe Theatre. Pollard played the role of Pinac in The Wild Goose Chase in the 1632 revival, and was in a number of other Fletcherian plays, The Lovers' Progress, The Maid in the Mill, The Queen of Corinth, Sir John van Olden Barnavelt, and The Spanish Curate.

Pollard acted parts in plays by Philip Massinger, including The Roman Actor (Aelius Lamia and Stephanus), Believe as You List (Berecinthius), and The Picture (Ubaldo). He also acted in works by John Ford, including The Laws of Candy and The Lover's Melancholy; and by James Shirley, including The Cardinal. He "doubled" several small parts in John Clavell's The Soddered Citizen (1630).

(The text of Believe as You List draws humor from the fatness of Berecinthius, the character played by Pollard. By 1631, the year the play was acted, Pollard seems to have grown corpulent.)

== Controversy ==
Pollard was intimately involved in a major controversy that marked the King's Men company in the 1630s. When the troupe had acquired its two theatres, the Globe (1598–99) and the Blackfriars (1608), prominent members of the company-owned shares in the theatres, and so gained additional shares in their profits, beyond what they earned as actors. They were termed "housekeepers" of the theatres. Over the next generation, actors died and passed their shares to their heirs; their replacements, in the next generation of actors, were cut out of the housekeepers' income (though as sharers in the acting company, they received their own portions of the profits). In 1635, three prominent actors, Pollard, Eliard Swanston, and Robert Benfield, petitioned the Lord Chancellor, Philip Herbert, 4th Earl of Pembroke, to be allowed to purchase theatre shares from the present housekeepers; and Pembroke agreed.

Those existing shareholders, principally Cuthbert Burbage and John Shank, did not want to sell their lucrative shares, however. The dispute generated a body of documents, sometimes called the Sharers' Papers, that reveal valuable information on the theatrical conditions of the Caroline era. The Sharers' Papers indicate that Pollard had an annual income of £180 at the time, purely as a sharer in the acting company.

== Later years ==
Pollard continued with the company even after the closing of the London theatres in September 1642, at the start of the English Civil War. He was one of the ten King's Men who signed the dedication to the first Beaumont and Fletcher folio of 1647, and one of the seven who tried to re-activate the company in 1648. He was also one of the performers arrested on 1 January 1649, when soldiers of the Commonwealth regime raided the Cockpit Theatre and caught actors in the midst of an illegal performance – of Rollo Duke of Normandy, as chance had it. Pollard was playing the Cook. The actors spent a short time incarcerated in Hatton House, then were released.

The Interregnum years were rough-and-tumble for unemployed or under-employed actors. In 1655 Theophilus Bird filed a lawsuit that claimed that Pollard and fellow King's Man Michael Bowyer, along with "some others", had sold the company's playbooks and its expensive costumes, and owed Bird a share in the proceeds. Bird claimed in his 1655 suit that Pollard was worth £500 when he died; but the date of his death is unknown. James Wright's Historia Histrionica (1699) states that Pollard "Lived Single, and Had a Competent Estate; Retired to some relations he had in the Country, and there ended his Life".
