= Gonzalo de Céspedes y Meneses =

Spanish novelist (c. 1585–1638)

Gonzalo de Céspedes y Meneses (c. 1585 – January 27, 1638) was a Spanish novelist.

== Biography ==
He was born at Madrid about 1585. Nothing positive is known of him before the publication of his celebrated romance, the Poema trágico del español Gerardo, y desengaño del amor lascivo (1615-1617). There is evidence that he had been sentenced to eight years at the galleys previous to January 1, 1620, and that the penalty had been remitted; but the nature of his offense is not stated. His treatment of political questions in the Historia apologética en los sucesos del reyno de Aragon, y su ciudad de Zaragoza, años de 91 y 92 (1622), has led to the confiscation of the book, Céspedes took up his residence at Zaragoza and Lisbon.

While in exile he issued a collection of six short stories entitled Historias peregrinas y exemplares (1623), the unfinished romance Varia fortuna del soldado Píndaro (1626), and the first part of his Historia de Felipe IV. (1631), a fulsome eulogy which was rewarded by the author's appointment as official historiographer to the Spanish king.

His novels, though written in a ponderous, affected style, display considerable imagination and insight into character. The Poema trágico has been utilized by John Fletcher in The Spanish Curate and in The Maid of the Mill.

The Historias peregrinas has been reprinted (1906) with a valuable introduction by Emilio Cotarelo y Mori.
