= King's Men personnel =

16th/17th-century group of actors

King's Men personnel were the people who worked with and for the Lord Chamberlain's Men and the King's Men (for all practical purposes a single continuous theatrical enterprise) from 1594 to 1642 (and after). The company was the major theatrical enterprise of its era and featured some of the leading actors of their generation – Richard Burbage, John Lowin, and Joseph Taylor among other – and some leading clowns and comedians, like Will Kempe and Robert Armin. The company benefitted from the services of William Shakespeare, John Fletcher, and Philip Massinger as regular dramatists.

The actors who performed the plays have left the most evidence of their lives and activities; but they were supported by musicians and other functionaries, and were enabled by managers and financial backers like Cuthbert Burbage.

For more information on specific individuals, see individual entries: Robert Armin, Christopher Beeston, Robert Benfield, etc.

== Terms ==
- "Sharer" – an actor who was a partner in the company and so received a share of the profits, as opposed to a simple "hired man" who earned a wage.
- A "householder" or "housekeeper" was an investor and sharer in one (or both) of the two theatres used by the troupe, the Globe and the Blackfriars. (The term "lessee" is also used, since the Globe was built on leased land and the Blackfriars facility was also leased. Partners in the theatres were partners in the leases.) The two theatres were organized separately from the acting company; actors could rise to be "sharers" in the company without being householders in the theatres, and some householders were not actors.
- "Necessary attendant" refers to the hired men on Sir Henry Herbert's list (dated 27 December 1624) of 24 "musicians and other necessary attendants" of the King's Men who could not be arrested or "pressed for soldiers" without the consent of the Master of the Revels or the Lord Chamberlain.
- "Principal actor" – The First Folio provided a list of 26 "principal actors" in Shakespeare's plays, down to 1623. The list includes only sharers in the company, and omits hired men.
- S.D.S. – The Seven Deadly Sins, probably by Richard Tarlton. A production c. 1591 involved a group of players who would later go on to form the Lord Chamberlain's Men.

== After 1642 ==
Twice in 1648, in January and December, different groups of former King's Men tried to re-activate the troupe, despite the formal prohibition on play-acting by the Commonwealth regime. The January endeavor involved Benfield, Bird, Clark, Hammerton, Lowin, Pollard, and Robinson (all of whom signed the dedication to the first Beaumont and Fletcher folio in 1647, along with Allen, Swanston, and Taylor). The December effort was by Baxter, Blagden, Burt, Clun, Cox, Hall, Kettleby, Loveday, and Charles and William Hart. Neither effort was successful, though groups of King's Men personnel were arrested at least twice in 1648 and 1649 for clandestine acting.

When the King's Company was formed in 1660, the troupe included Loveday, Clun, Burt, Blagden, Bird, Baxter, and Charles Hart.

== Personnel ==
- John Adson – musician (cornet). He played a ghost "with a brace of greyhounds" in The Late Lancashire Witches in 1634. He married Jane Balls, sister of Richard Balls.
- William Allen – actor and sharer. Like Theophilus Bird, Michael Bowyer, Hugh Clark, and William Robbins, he came to the company from Queen Henrietta's Men sometime in the 1637–40 period. He became a Groom of the Chamber on 22 January 1641, along with Bird, Bowyer, Clark, Robbins, and Stephen Hammerton.
- Robert Armin – principal actor.
- Edward Ashborne – "necessary attendant."
- John Bacon – actor; hired man, 1635–37. He appeared in the 1635 revival of Love's Pilgrimage.
- Francis Balls – hired man; possibly a musician and walk-on actor. He had a non-speaking role in Believe as You List in 1631.
- Richard Balls – composer. He taught music in the King's service, and played for the City of London.
- Richard Baxter – actor.
- Ambrose Beeland, or Byland – musician (violinist), 1624–28; "necessary attendant."
- Christopher Beeston – actor, hired man, 1598–1602.
- Robert Benfield – principal actor.
- George Birch – actor, c. 1616–25; hired man. He married Elizabeth, daughter of Richard Cowley. He started out as a boy player; among his roles were Fine Madame Would-be in Volpone and Doll Common in The Alchemist. A prolific performer, he was also in The Double Marriage, The False One, The Island Princess, The Laws of Candy, The Lovers' Progress, The Pilgrim, The Prophetess, Sir John van Olden Barnavelt, The Spanish Viceroy, and A Wife for a Month.
- Theophilus Bird – actor, sharer. His father, William Bird or William Bourne, may have been with the Lord Chamberlain's Men c. 1597, before moving on to other companies in a long career.
- Nicholas Blagden – actor. He was one of ten men to tried to re-activate the King's Men in December 1648.
- Richard Bowers – actor, hired man, 1636–42.
- Michael Bowyer – actor, sharer.
- Robert Browne – a householder in the Globe, after he inherited a share though William Sly's last will and testament in 1608. Brown, an actor, had a four-decade-long career with other companies; he soon sold his share to Heminges and Condell in partnership. (He should not be confused with the "other" Robert Browne the actor.)
- George Bryan – principal actor.
- Alexander Bullard – musician (recorder player); "necessary attendant."
- Cuthbert Burbage – manager/investor.
- James Burbage – theatre manager.
- Richard Burbage – principal actor.
- Winifred Turner Burbage – the widow of Richard Burbage, she became a householder in both theatres when her husband died. She later married Richard Robinson.
- Nicholas Burt – actor. He began as a boy player, an apprentice to John Shank. He was one of the King's Men arrested on 5 February 1648, while playing in Rollo Duke of Normandy. His career continued into the Restoration; he played Othello in 1660 and 1669.
- William Carver – "necessary attendant."
- William Chambers – musician; "necessary attendant."
- Hugh Clark – actor and sharer.
- Mary Clark, or Mary Woods – a householder in the Globe Theatre from 1604. Thomas Pope left part of his share in the Globe to Mary Clark in his last will and testament; she later married a John Edmunds or Edmans, who shared in her share.
- Robert Clark – "necessary attendant."
- Henry Clay – "necessary attendant."
- Walter Clun – actor. Like Charles Hart, he was a boy player prior to the closing of the theatres in 1642, who continued his career as an adult actor in 1660.
- Jeffrey Collins – musician; "necessary attendant." He died c. 1641.
- Elizabeth Condell – widow of Henry Condell, she became a householder in both the Globe and Blackfriars through her husband's will. In 1635, the year of her death, she owned a quarter-interest in the Globe (four of sixteen shares), and one of eight shares in the Blackfriars.
- Henry Condell – principal actor.
- Alexander Cooke – principal actor.
- Robert Cox – actor. He was one of the ten men who attempted to restart the King's Men in December 1648. Cox then became famous as a performer of the "drolls" that were an allowed form of theatre during the Interregnum.
- Ralph Crane – scribe.
- Richard Cowley – principal actor.
- Samuel Crosse – actor; listed among the 26 "principal actors" of Shakespeare's plays in the First Folio, but mentioned nowhere else in the company's documentation. He may have become a sharer in the company in 1604, but died soon after.
- Rowland Dowle – actor, hired man, 1628–36. He played small parts in Believe as You List and the 1635 revival of Love's Pilgrimage. He left the company for Queen Henrietta's Men, and was in their 1636 revival of The Witch of Edmonton; but he returned to the King's Men in time for their 1638 revival of The Chances.
- John Duke – actor, hired man, 1598–1602. He was cast in Every Man in His Humour, 1598, and appears to have followed Christopher Beeston to Worcester's Men.
- William Ecclestone – principal actor.
- Henry Evans – theatre manager. He was associated with the Blackfriars Theatre from the mid-1580s on.
- Thomas Evans – agent for Henry Evans. He became a householder in the Blackfriars Theatre in 1608, apparently representing relative Henry Evans.
- Nathan Field – principal actor; playwright.
- John Fletcher – playwright.
- Lawrence Fletcher – actor.
- William Gascoyne – "necessary attendant."
- Samuel Gilburne – actor; like Crosse, listed among the 26 "principal actors," but little is known of him. A former apprentice of Phillips, he may have become a sharer c. 1605, but died soon after.
- Alexander Gough – actor; hired man. Born in 1614, he was the son of Robert Gough. Boy player, 1626–32, possibly an adult actor to c. 1637.
- Robert Gough – actor, one of the 26 "principal actors" in the First Folio list. He may have been associated with the original actors group from S.D.S. He was in The Second Maiden's Tragedy and Sir John van Olden Barnavelt. He died in 1624; father of Alexander Gough.
- Curtis Greville – actor; hired man, 1626–33. He played Mountain the goldsmith in The Soddered Citizen; he was in The Lover's Melancholy and The Swisser. He probably was the "Curtis" who played small roles in The Two Noble Kinsmen. By 1634 he was a sharer in the King's Revels Men.
- William Hall – actor. He was one of ten men who tried to re-activate the King's Men in December 1648. His long stage career started by 1630; in 1660 his compatriots agreed to pay him a small pension if he would retire from the troupe. He complied, but the others stopped paying him a year later. Hall sued them.
- Stephen Hammerton – actor, sharer.
- Charles Hart – actor.
- William Hart – actor; hired man, 1636–37. Father of Charles Hart. Both Harts were among the ten players who tried to re-activate the troupe in December 1648.
- Richard Hawley – actor; hired man, 1636–40. He died in the later year.
- John Heminges – principal actor.
- Thomasine Heminges Ostler – daughter of John Heminges and wife of William Ostler, she should have become a householder in both theatres upon her husband's death in December 1614. But Ostler died intestate, and John Heminges was able to seize control of the theatre shares; Mary took her father to court in 1615, apparently unsuccessfully. All of Heminges's shares eventually passed to his son, dramatist William Heminges.
- Thomas Hobbs – actor; hired man, 1626–37. He had a role in Believe as You List (1631).
- Thomas Holcombe – actor; boy player, 1618–25. He was in The Custom of the Country, The Knight of Malta, The Little French Lawyer, The Prophetess, The Queen of Corinth, and Women Pleased. He died in August 1625; his widow married actor Ellis Worth the next year.
- John Holland – actor, hired man. He was one of the S.D.S. actors, and joined the Chamberlain's Men on their foundation in 1594. Thomas Pope's 1603 will noted Holland as a lodger in Pope's house.
- John Honyman – actor; playwright?
- James Horn – actor, hired man, 1620s. He was in The Pilgrim (1621) and The Lover's Melancholy (1628).
- Edward Horton – actor; boy player and singer, 1629–30. He played a female role in The Deserving Favourite in 1629, and had a part in The Mad Lover.
- Anthony Jeffes – actor, hired man, was probably with Lord Chamberlain's Men c. 1594–97. He was with Pembroke's Men in the difficult year of 1597, then with the Admiral's Men to 1613.
- Humphrey Jeffes – actor, hired man, was probably with Lord Chamberlain's Men c. 1594–97. Like his brother Anthony, above, he passed through Pembroke's Men to the Admiral's, to c. 1616.
- Robert Johnson – composer, particularly associated with productions at the Blackfriars Theatre.
- William Kempe – principal actor.
- George Kettleby – actor. He was one of the ten who tried to restart the King's Men in December 1648.
- Anthony Knight – "necessary attendant."
- Edward Knight – prompter and "book-keeper;" "necessary attendant."
- William Lawes – composer.
- Thomas Loveday – actor. He was one of the ten men who tried to re-activate the company in December 1648. His career began in 1634, and lasted until his death in 1671.
- G. Lowen – the boy player who took the role of Barnavelt's Daughter in the 1619 production of Sir John van Olden Barnavelt.
- John Lowin – principal actor.
- William Mago – actor; hired man, 1624–31; "necessary attendant." He was in Believe as You List. He died in 1632.
- Philip Massinger – playwright.
- Basil Nicoll – a householder in the Globe. In his will, Thomas Pope left his share in the Globe to Mary Clark (see above) and a Thomas Bromley. Nicoll, a scrivener who was one of the executors of Pope's will, appears to have acted as a trustee for Bromley (a minor), since Nicoll is named as a householder in legal documents in 1615.
- William Ostler – principal actor.
- Robert Pallant – actor; "necessary attendant." Born 1605, he was a boy player and apprentice to Heminges, 1620; a hired man, 1620–25. His father, another Robert Pallant (died 1619), had a two-decade acting career with several companies, perhaps including a short stint with the Lord Chamberlain's Men, c. 1597–98.
- William Patrick – actor, 1624–37; "necessary attendant." He played minor roles in The Roman Actor and Believe as You List.
- William Penn – actor, a hired man with a long career in several companies. He started as a boy player, in Epicene in 1609. He was with the King's Men, 1626–37; he had parts in The Lover's Melancholy and The Picture.
- Andrew Pennycuicke – actor.
- Richard Perkins – actor, with the company 1623–25.
- Augustine Phillips – principal actor.
- Thomas Pollard – actor, sharer.
- Thomas Pope – principal actor.
- Timothy Read – actor. A famous clown in his own era, Read may have been a member of the King's Men in 1641.
- John Rhodes – "necessary attendant." A disputed figure: either John Rhodes the company's wardrobe keeper, or another man of the same name, a musician who died in February 1636.
- John Rice – actor; one of the 26 "principal actors," and the last-named on the list; a boy player and Heminges' apprentice in 1607. He was in Sir John van Olden Barnavelt in 1619; he became a sharer c. 1620, but retired after 1625 to become a parish clerk.
- George Rickner – musician? (trumpeter?); "necessary attendant."
- William Robbins – actor and sharer.
- Richard Robinson – principal actor.
- William Rowley – actor, with the company 1623–25.
- James Sands, or Saunder – boy player and Augustine Phillips's apprentice. Phillips left Sands 40 shillings and three musical instruments in his 1605 last will and testament; but William Sly left Sands £40 in his 1608 will. An obscure figure, Sands may have been with Queen Anne's Men c. 1617.
- William Saunders – musician (bass viol and sackbut); "necessary attendant." He died in 1674.
- Edward Shakerley – actor, musician; a "necessary attendant" in December 1624, he is also listed in the cast of Massinger's The Renegado (printed 1630).
- William Shakespeare – principal actor; playwright.
- John Shank – principal actor.
- Richard Sharpe – actor; "necessary attendant."
- John Sinklo or Sincler – actor; a hired man who played "thin man" comedy parts, like Pinch in The Comedy of Errors and Shadow in Henry IV, Part 2. He filled five minor roles in S.D.S., and was with the troupe at least until The Malcontent in 1604.
- William Sly – principal actor.
- Anthony Smith – actor; hired man, 1626–31. He was in The Roman Actor, The Lover's Melancholy, The Deserving Favourite, The Soddered Citizen, and The Swisser. He had been with Prince Charles's Men, 1616–25.
- William Styles – actor, hired man 1636–37.
- Eliard Swanston – actor.
- R. T. – he played small Messenger roles in Sir John van Olden Barnavelt.
- William Tawyer, or Toyer – musician (trumpeter); "necessary attendant." According to the First Folio, he led the Athenian "mechanicals" onstage with his trumpet, for their playlet in Act V of A Midsummer Night's Dream.
- Joseph Taylor – principal actor.
- John Thompson – actor, sharer.
- Nicholas Tooley – principal actor.
- William Trigg – actor; hired man, 1625–37; a boy player apprenticed to Heminges. He played female roles in The Roman Actor, The Picture, The Soddered Citizen, The Swisser, and the 1632 revival of The Wild Goose Chase. He had an unspecified part in The Lover's Melancholy. He was with Beeston's Boys in 1639, and served as a captain in the Royalist army during the English Civil War.
- Thomas Tuckfield – "necessary attendant."
- Nicholas Underhill – actor and musician (trumpeter), 1619–31; "necessary attendant." He was Beeland's apprentice in music, 1620–32. He died in 1637.
- John Underwood – principal actor.
- George Vernon – actor; hired man, 1617–30; "necessary attendant." He was in The Lover's Melancholy and the Roman Actor.
- Henry Wilson – musician (lutenist and singer), 1624–31; "necessary attendant." Apprenticed to Heminges in 1611, he played Balthazar in Much Ado About Nothing. He would become professor of music at the University of Oxford in 1656.
- John Wilson – composer.
- John Witter – a householder in the Globe, after he married the widow of Augustine Phillips. He forfeited his share in 1613, when the Globe burned down; he declined to invest in its replacement.
