= The Swisser =

The Swisser is a Caroline era stage play, a tragicomedy written by Arthur Wilson. It was performed by the King's Men in the Blackfriars Theatre in 1631, and is notable for the light in throws on the workings of the premier acting company of its time.

(In seventeenth-century parlance, "Swisser," or "Swizzer" or "Switzer," referred to a Swiss mercenary soldier.)

Though Humphrey Moseley entered the play into the Stationers' Register on 4 September 1646, no edition of the drama was printed in the seventeenth century. The play remained in manuscript until it was published in the early 1900s. The manuscript, now Add. MS. 36,749 in the collection of the British Museum, is in the author's hand.

== The play ==
The Swisser shares the primary fault of Caroline drama as a whole; it is unoriginal and highly derivative of earlier works. Felix Schelling catalogued the play's stock elements as "the lecherous tyrant; the love-lorn girl page; the banished lord...; two old men of noble houses, enemies; their children, in love; poison evaded by the substitution of a sleeping potion; a fair captive generously treated by a chivalrous soldier, her captor; and...consanguinity a bar to virtuous love." Schelling cites Campaspe, Romeo and Juliet, The Malcontent, Philaster, and 'Tis Pity She's a Whore as dramatic precedents. (He also concedes that the play "is not bad, as such productions go.")

== The cast ==
The cast list supplied by the manuscript is one of only eight extant King's Men lists from the period of the 1620s and the early 1630s, making it a valuable source of information on the company in this era.

Role	Actor
The King of the Lombards	Richard Sharpe
Arioldus, a nobleman retir'd	Joseph Taylor
Andrucho, a Swisser otherwise Count Aribert banish'd	John Lowin
Timentes, a fearful General	Thomas Pollard
Antharis	Robert Benfield
Clephis	William Penn
Alcidonus, son to Antharis	Eliard Swanston
Asprandus	Anthony Smith
Iseas	Curtis Greville
Panopia, the King's sister	John Thompson
Eurinia, a captive	Alexander Gough
Selina, daughter to Clephis	William Trigg

Greville, Penn and Smith were hired men, and Goughe, Thompson, and Trigg were boy players filling female roles. The other six were the "sharers," partners, permanent members of the company. The burly Lowin plays a character of "great Beard and Bulke" – Smith's Asprandus and Greville's Iseas are "two little Pigmies" in comparison (Act III, scene 2).

[The other seven King's Men cast lists are for the company's productions of John Webster's The Duchess of Malfi, Philip Massinger's The Roman Actor, The Picture, and Believe as You List, Lodowick Carlell's The Deserving Favourite, John Clavell's The Soddered Citizen, and John Fletcher's The Wild Goose Chase. The 1629 quarto of John Ford's The Lover's Melancholy provides a roster of the 17 actors involved, but doesn't assign them to their roles.]

== Synopsis ==
The play is set in Lombardy, and bases its characters on actual historical figures of the early seventh century A.D.

As the play opens, Lombard soldiers are fleeing the battlefield, after defeat by the forces of Ravenna. The Swiss mercenary Andrucho, the title character, observes and comments upon the action. The King of the Lombards enters with his courtiers, including his cowardly and defeated general Timentes. (Andrucho, an unsubtle soldier, functions as something like the King's jester; the King calls him his "bandog," and allows the Swiss to criticize the courtiers with little restraint.) The King demands that Timentes rally the troops and lead a counterattack. Andrucho and the old courtier Clephis speak up critically; Clephis in particular advises the King to replace Timentes with the banished nobleman Arioldus. The Lombard troops themselves cry out and demand Arioldus for their commander.

The second scene shows Arioldus at his country estate; he lives in retirement with his books, glad to be away from the royal court. Andrucho comes to visit him; their conversation reveals that the Swiss mercenary is actually Aribert, another banished Lombard nobleman. Suddenly, courtiers begin arriving at Arioldus's house, assuring him of their (previously invisible) support and affection. Clearly, a change is in the wind. The King arrives, reverses Arioldus's banishment, and appoints him general of the army. The common troops are revitalized, and Arioldus wins a quick (offstage) victory over the army of Ravenna.

Arioldus comes away from his victory with a young female captive called Eurinia. An honorable man, Arioldus protects the virtue of his captive; but she quickly becomes a focus of courtly gossip. When the King meets her, he is strongly taken with her beauty; Arioldus wants to shield Eurinia, but the King commands both of them to attend at his court.

The early scenes in the play delineate two factions: the virtuous courtiers, Arioldus, Clephis, and Andrucho/Aribert, are opposed to the more amoral, cynical and self-interested courtiers, Antharis, Asprandus, and Iseas. Antharis and Clephis are old rivals; but their children, respectively son Alcidonus and daughter Selina, are in love and secretly married – though parental opposition forces them to conceal the fact and live apart.

Timentes comes to be the play's clown substitute, its focus for broad humor. Andrucho and other courtiers convince Timentes that he is being pursued by an angry mob. To hide, Timentes climbs into an empty coffin, and faints from fear. He is thought dead, until he recovers consciousness and climbs back out of the coffin. Later, Timentes gains a false courage through drunkenness.

At court, the King attempts to seduce Eurinia; she resists and stand upon her honor, but the hot-blooded King rapes her. Arioldus learns of the crime, and faces a conflict between his personal honor and his oath of loyalty to the King. The two men confront each other over the issue – but the King is penitent, in his own limited way; he tries to repair matters by arranging a marriage between Arioldus and his sister, the princess Panopia. Arioldus rejects this; and the King offers to fight him, even providing Arioldus a pardon in advance, in case Arioldus kills him. The two are about to fight, when the eavesdropping Andrucho interrupts and prevents them.

The young lovers Alcidonus and Selina are surprised in a clandestine meeting, and separated by their fathers. Antharis, ignorant of their marriage, tries to squelch their affair by telling his son a giant lie – that Alcidonus is a bastard, and Selina's half-brother. The two lovers meet over this distressing news; believing themselves guilty of incest, they decide on suicide. They share a vial of poison. Their bodies are found, and Antharis is driven mad by the consequences of his deception. But the prudent Clephis, anticipating trouble, made sure that what the lovers thought was poison was only a sleeping potion. The lovers recover, though Antharis does not.

The drama concludes in a large revelation scene, in which Arioldus, Andrucho, and Panopia manipulate the King into a positive resolution. A faked assassination attempt reminds the King that he is not invulnerable. Andrucho is revealed as Aribert, and redeemed from banishment; Eurinia is revealed as Aribert's daughter Eugenia. Years before, the King had loved Eugenia; now, he marries her as a way of repairing the damage he has done to her. Arioldus and Panopia also marry, yielding the requisite happy ending of the tragicomic form.

== Commonalities ==
In having a supposedly dead body rise from its coffin, Wilson is exploiting a time-honored stage effect of English Renaissance drama. A roster of earlier instances of the trick, with no pretense to completeness, could include Marston's Antonio and Mellida (c. 1600), Beaumont's The Knight of the Burning Pestle (1607), Shakespeare's Pericles, Prince of Tyre (c. 1609), and several plays in the canon of John Fletcher and his collaborators. Middleton employs a single instance of the device in The Puritan (c. 1607), and a doubled instance in A Chaste Maid in Cheapside (1613).

The moral resolution of the play, in which a rapist makes up for his crime by marrying his victim, is an abomination to modern sensibilities – but an acceptable thing to the minds of the 17th century. It occurs in other plays of the era; a notable example is found in the Fletcher collaboration The Queen of Corinth (c. 1617), though other instances could also be cited.
