= John van Olden Barnavelt =

Jacobean-era play

The Tragedy of Sir John van Olden Barnavelt is a Jacobean play written by John Fletcher and Philip Massinger in 1619, and produced in the same year by the King's Men at the Globe Theatre. Based on controversial contemporaneous political events, the play was itself controversial and had to survive an attempt at suppression by religious authorities.

== Historical facts ==
The historical Johan van Oldenbarnevelt (spellings vary), "Lord of Berkel, Rodenrys, etc.," was a prominent Dutch politician and statesman who was executed in The Hague on 13 May 1619. He was beheaded at the age of 71, after a conviction on a charge of high treason for allegedly conspiring with the Spanish enemies of the Netherlands – though he maintained his innocence to the end of his life. Since Holland was an English ally and English troops had long been involved in their conflict with Spain, the case of Oldenbarnevelt was of immense interest in England.

== Ideology ==
Fletcher and Massinger composed a drama on the subject that was ready for the stage in a scant three months, by August 1619. The play they wrote has been described as "an ideologically charged work with distinct republican and anti-authoritarian connotations." It was actable on the Jacobean stage only because it conformed to the official line on Oldenbarnevelt's life and death. King James I was an opponent of the Dutch statesman, and especially of his Arminianism. The Prince of Orange, Oldenbarnevelt's rival and the main engine of his downfall, was a close ally of James. In the play, Barnavelt is plainly guilty of treason and attempts to seduce English soldiers to join with him – unsuccessfully, of course.

The play even touches on contemporary anti-feminism. It includes an Englishwoman who disputes with Dutch Arminian women about the proper role of women in society. The Englishwoman is traditional in outlook, while her Dutch counterparts think that women should rule. Some readers, like Algernon Charles Swinburne, stated that this was anti-feminist satire.

== Censorship ==
The play was censored by George Buck, the Master of the Revels, for its political content. Buc was not interested in suppressing a play that endorsed the official line on the subject; rather, he worked to ensure that the play did its job in a way that served the government's interests. The surviving manuscript shows that most of Buc's edits consisted of small changes, "altering the tone or tweaking a phrase." In one place where such tweaking was inadequate, Barnavelt's speech of self-defense in his trial scene in Act IV, Buc cut out the entire speech. (Coincidentally, Buc had been James' diplomatic representative in the Netherlands and was personally acquainted with both Prince Maurice and Oldenbarnevelt.)

(Buc trimmed lines that could be considered anti-monarchical; he also cut a 14-line section in the opening scene, which described the prostitutes who cluster around London theatres.)

Even after meeting Buc's political vetting, the play had to confront religious censorship. In 1619 as for a long period previously, the Bishop of London had the authority to approve or disapprove plays for their religious conformity, as the government did for political content; and Barnavelt touched on the sensitive subject of Arminian-Calvinist rivalry. The Bishop acted to stop the play on 14 August 1619, just before its premiere. Yet the play was in the interest of the state, and the actors managed to get clearance to perform it; Barnavelt was on the boards by 16 August.

== Manuscript ==
Though it was a popular success, Barnavelt was not published in the seventeenth century. It remained in manuscript until 1883, when Bullen included it in his Old English Plays, Vol. 2. The manuscript is now in the collection of the British Museum, identified as Add. MS. 18653. It is a fair copy of the play text prepared by the professional scribe Ralph Crane, who worked repeatedly for the King's Men in the early seventeenth century and would prepare copy for some of Shakespeare's plays for the First Folio (1623). Crane's manuscript is of high quality, with full Act-and-scene divisions; it is marked by two other hands. The prompter of the King's Men added details about stage props, sound effects (horns offstage), and other matters needed for performance, indicating that the manuscript was going to be used, and in all likelihood was used, as the prompt-book for the production; and it also bears Buc's censorship marks.

== Authorship ==
One notable aspect of Crane's manuscript is that it faithfully reproduces the textual and linguistic preferences of the two authors. Scholars have long recognized that Fletcher had a highly distinctive profile of linguistic usages that allows his share in collaborative works to be distinguished from others – like Francis Beaumont, or as in this case, Philip Massinger. Scholars can therefore agree on a breakdown of the two authors' contributions with near unanimity:

Massinger – Act I, scenes 1 and 2; Act II, 1; Act III, 2, 5, and 6; Act IV, 4–5; Act V, 1 (except middle portion);
Fletcher – Act I, scene 3; Act II, 2–6; Act III, 1, 3, and 4; Act IV, 1–3; Act V, 1 (middle portion, from exit of Ambassadors to exit of Provost), 2, and 3.

The authors appear to have been influenced by the similar contemporary histories of George Chapman, especially his two-part play The Conspiracy and Tragedy of Charles, Duke of Byron (1608).

== Actors ==
The manuscript also contains mentions of some of the King's Men in the cast, under their own names. (The manuscript for Believe as You List shows the same type of identifications.) Some of these are cryptic: "Michael," no last name given, was a captain; an otherwise-unknown "R. T." played several small roles. The part of Barnavelt's daughter was filled by G. Lowen, an otherwise-unknown boy player. "Nick" played Barnavelt's wife; some scholars have assumed that this was Nicholas Tooley – but Tooley was nearing 40 years old in 1619. "Nick" was possibly Nick Underwood or another boy active in the company at the time.

These data in the MS. allow a partial reconstruction of the cast in the 1619 production:

- George Birch played a servant, and likely doubled other parts;
- Robert Gough played Leidenberck;
- Thomas Holcombe played the Provost's Wife, and likely doubled other female roles;
- Thomas Pollard played Barnavelt's supporter Holderus;
- John Rice played a Dutch Captain;
- Richard Robinson played a captain, and the French Ambassador.

T. H. Howard-Hill made an attempt to reconstruct the casting of the play's other roles, based on what is known about the personnel of the King's Men in 1619 and the types of roles they took. His least uncertain guesses are that John Lowin most likely played Barnavelt, and Joseph Taylor the Prince of Orange.

== Characters ==
-Sir John van Olden Barnavelt. The aging advocate of Holland and West Friesland. Filled with growing pride, he resents the power and the excellent reputation of the Prince of Orange, and he conspires to arouse sedition to regain the control he thinks he has lost. Brought before the senate, he defends himself against charges of treachery by reiterating his real contributions to his nation, and he pathetically tries to console himself for his fall by recalling the esteem in which he was held by many monarchs in his younger days. He swears, even as he stands on the scaffold awaiting execution, that he has not committed treason, and he dies praying for his prince and casting "honour and the world" behind him.

-Leidenberch. Barnavelt's fellow conspirator, secretary of the States of Utrecht. He is notoriously a smooth-tongued flatterer and a man who will promise anything; one soldier complains that no suitor ever left him dissatisfied, yet none ever received what he wanted. Lacking the strength to remain silent after the defeat of his forces, he confesses his part in Barnavelt's plot before he is imprisoned. Convinced by Barnavelt that suicide is the only way to preserve some semblance of honor, he resolves to die, then delays a few moments to speak of the pain of leaving his beloved young son, who sleeps nearby.

-Modesbargen. Another of Barnavelt's followers. He is at first wary of the old statesman's plans and counsels him bluntly not to risk destroying the effects of his forty years of service to the state by giving vent to his ambition. He eventually joins Barnavelt's campaign and is forced to flee to Germany to escape imprisonment. There he grows to love country living and calls himself a fool for participating in political schemes.

-Grotius. Another of Barnavelt's followers. He, with Hogerbeets, vows to defend the old man against the prince of Orange, but the discovery of their plot makes their efforts futile.

-Hogerbeets. A leader of the Arminians, the sect Barnavelt makes pawns in his attempt to gain power.

-Maurice, the Prince of Orange. A just and wise ruler who shares his responsibilities with his council. He restrains his followers, who are eager to vent their justifiable anger against Barnavelt, yet he is strong-willed enough to exert military force when it is necessary to put down rebellion in Utrecht. Although his natural inclination is to be merciful, he finally orders Barnavelt's death to show that law and order are stronger than the corrupt policies of even the wisest of men.

-Bredero and Vandort. Lords of the State. They listen sympathetically to Barnavelt's initial plans, but they soon recognize his ambition for what it is and remain loyal supporters of order and the prince.

-William and Henry. Loyal supporters of Prince Maurice.

-Rockgiles. Barnavelt's chief ally among the burghers.

-English Captain. Foreigner who makes an impassioned defense of soldiers, whose only honor lies in their obedience and loyalty to their ruler.

-Holderus. A scholar, held firmly under control by a group of domineering Dutch women. He supports Barnavelt and flees the advancing army of the prince in terror.

-William. Barnavelt's son, who acts as his aide. He brings his father word of Leidenberch's suicide.

-Leidenberch's son. A precocious, sensitive boy who looks after his father in prison. He is rather like Christopher Marlowe's Prince Edward and several of William Shakespeare's bright young children.

-Boisise and Morier. French ambassadors who go to the prince to protest the death of Barnavelt, whom they have known only as a wise statesman.

-The executioners from Harlem, Leyden, and Utrecht. Grotesque humorists who throw dice to see who is to have the privilege of executing Sir John.

== Synopsis ==
This synopsis corresponds to the act and scene divisions in Fredson Bowers, ed. The dramatic works in the Beaumont and Fletcher Canon, (Cambridge: Cambridge University Press, 1966), 485–632.

Act 1, Scene 1: The Hague: Barnavelt in conference with his co-conspirators
The play opens with Barnavelt in conversation with his three main co-conspirators, Leidenberch, Modesbargen, and Grotius. Leidenberch tells Barnavelt that the people revere the Prince of Orange, and credit him (rather than Barnavelt) for bringing peace to the provinces. Groitus says that the Prince has become swollen with pride, and this has led him to take credit for Barnavelt's accomplishments. Barnavelt responds with an egotistic speech expressing deep jealousy of the Prince and a sense that his service to the State has been overlooked (an attitude he will sustain throughout the play). He says that he will see his country overthrown again before he allows the Prince to overshadow his accomplishments. Noting Barnavelt's edgy distemper, Modesbargen suggest that the old man is slipping into a second childhood in his old age. He questions the wisdom of sullying a lifetime of service to the State in order to recapture a few moments of glory. After reviewing Barnavelt's various accomplishments, he asks what more could possibly be gained, and adds that a rebellion would only lead to destruction. Barnavelt rejects Modesbargen's criticism and vows to regain the honour he feels he has lost. Grotius, Leidenberch, and Modesbargen all vow to assist Barnavelt in his plans. Two English captains enter. The Second Captain is to be judged by Barnavelt for speaking scornfully about the Lords of the State. Barnavelt relieves the Second Captain of his command, and scornfully suggest that he apply to the Prince of Orange for assistance (the English troops are positioned in the country to assist the Prince). Barnavelt, Grotius, and Modesbargen exit. Leidenberch privately tells the Second Captain that he will intervene for him and exits as well. The Second Captain tells the First Captain that Leidenberch cannot be trusted: "This is he / that never did man good: and yet no Suitor / Ever departed discontented from him: / Hee’ll promise anything" (1.1.163–66). He says that, rather than trusting Leidenberch, he will seek to reestablish himself by bribing Barnavelt's wife or by furnishing a prostitute for Barnavelt's son. The First Captain says that he can help out with gold to bribe Barnavelt's wife, and, in a moment of meta-theatricality, he remarks that if he had known, he could have procured a prostitute from amongst the "poor wretches" (1.1.183) that crowd around the London theaters.

Act 1, Scene 2: The Hague: Barnavelt in conference with the Arminian leaders
In an attempt to enlist the support of the Arminians (a religious sect), Barnavelt and his co-conspirators meet with Hogerbeets, the Arminian leader. Barnavelt makes an open (and obviously false) declaration of his Arminianism. He urges Groitus and Hogerbeets enroll companies of citizens (burghers) in the provincial cities to defend the sect against its enemy, the Prince of Orange, whose regular troops are garrisoned at Utrecht. Groitus and Hogerbeets agree to follow Barnavelt's requests and exit. Once again, Modesbargen assumes the role of cautious objector, this time arguing that religion should not be made a cloak for subversive political activity. Barnavelt cynically replies that he is prepared to use any weapon that will serve his cause. Bredero and Vandort, two Lords of the State, enter. Barnavelt persuades them to lock the Prince of Orange out of a meeting of the Lords that is about to take place. In an aside, he extols the swift progression of his scheme: "I have one foote on his neck, / Ere long ile set the other on his head, / And sinck him to the Center" (1.2.80–82).

Act 1, Scene 3: The Hague: Entrance to the Council Chambers for the Lords of the State
The Prince arrives at the Council Chamber. A guard respectfully informs him that the Lords of the State have ordered them to bar his entrance. The Prince's attendants are outraged by this insult and suggest a forcible entry. Exhibiting characteristic cool-headedness and modesty, the Prince urges restraint. Barnavelt enters with his co-conspirators. The Prince asks how he has offended them. In a harsh reply, Barnavelt accuses the Prince of haughtiness. He exits with Leidenberch and Modesbargen. The Prince is left onstage with Bredero and Vandort. He says that Barnavelt has become a monster. Bredero and Vandort are shocked and offended, not only by Barnavelt's outspokenness and offensive tone, but also by his assumption to speak for them. They assure the Prince of their loyalty. The Prince resolves to move against the towns in which Barnavelt's supporters have raised citizen companies.

Act 2, Scene 1: Utrecht: Barnavelt in conference with his co-conspirators
In a meeting with Leidenberch and Modesbargen, Barnavelt reveals that his plot has been discovered, and that Bredero and Vandort are helping the Prince of Orange to disband the pro-Barnavelt citizen companies. He expresses confidence, however, that the Prince will not risk civil war, and that, in any case, his reputation will protect him from harm. Leidenberch reports that the citizen-companies are ready to follow Barnavelt into war, and that the preachers "play their parts too, / And thunder in their Pulpitts, hell and dampnation / To such as hold against us" (2.1.587-89). Barnavelt ask if Leidenberch has managed to persuade the English garrison to desert the Prince and join the insurrection. In answer to his question, an English captain enters with Rockgiles (Barnavelt's chief ally among the burghers), and a burgher. As Barnavelt and the conspirators step aside, Rockgiles asks the English captain if he will join the insurrection. The English captain rejects the proposal outright, vowing to remain loyal to the Prince of Orange. He exits. Coming forward, Barnavelt worries that a crisis is nearing: without the aid of the English garrison, the rebellion has a much poorer chance against the Prince of Orange. Nevertheless, he urges his followers to muster the citizen companies and makes plans to return to the Hague to prepare a diverting action.

Act 2, Scene 2: Utrecht: Four Dutchwomen in conversation with an English gentlewoman
Four Dutch women, all ardent feminists, attempt to convince a visiting English gentlewoman of the advantages of living in a free society, where women can rule their husbands and inquire into the doings of their rulers. As they ridicule the English soldiers' loyalty to the Prince of Orange, Leidenberch enters with news that the Prince had disarmed all of the other towns. He encourages the women to rally their husbands to battle. As the women exit, a messenger enters with news that the Prince is approaching the barriers of the city.

Act 2, Scene 3: Inside the gates of Utrecht
The citizen rebels begin to arm themselves, but the gates are guarded by English soldiers, who refuse to give up their posts to citizen reliefs.

Act 2, Scene 4: Outside the gates of Utrecht
The Prince arrives at the city with his forces. The English soldiers let him in, but they worry that he does not have enough men with him.

Act 2, Scene 5: Utrecht: Leidenberch in conference with Groitus and Rockgiles
Leidenberch tells Groitus and Rockgiles that the Prince has entered the city, but he doesn't have many men with him. Rockgiles says that the Arminian soldiers are waiting to meet the Prince in the marketplace, and that the Prince's forces have gained control of the port (a surprise move that Barnavelt's supporters did not anticipate). Leidenberch curses their luck and worries that they have been outmaneuvered. In confirmation of his fears, a messenger enters and announces that the Prince has brought three companies of horsemen and ten companies of footmen in through the port (a decisive development). Leidenberch says that the rebel action is ruined.

Act 2, Scene 6: Utrecht
The feminist Dutchwomen lament the Prince's victory. Their husbands (the burgher rebels) tell them to go home and pray for their souls, as they expect to be hanged soon. The English gentlewoman enters and gloatingly asks the Dutchwomen if their opinion of the Prince has changed. She also says that the Dutchwomen's fear stinks like garlic. The Prince of Orange enters with soldiers holding Leidenberch and other citizen-dissidents captive. He says that Leidenberch will be sent to The Hague to await trial. A soldier reports that Modesbargen has fled to Germany.

Act 3, Scene 1: The Hague: Bredero in conference with Vandort
Back at The Hague, Bredero and Vandort celebrate the news of the Prince's victory. They lament the fall of Barnavelt and remark on the shame of allowing such an admirable career fall into disgrace. Barnavelt enters with his son. Vandort notes that Barnavelt seems somehow deadened. They try to get away without addressing him, but Barnavelt demands due recognition and accuses them of slighting him in favour of the Prince. Vandort says that, in spite of Barnavelt's former service, he is now viewed as a suspected traitor. Bredero urges Barnavelt to reform. Barnavelt's son exits. Barnavelt launches into a characteristic tirade, reaffirming his hatred of the Prince and complaining about the ungratefulness of the State he worked so hard to defend. Bredero and Vandort exit. Barnavelt's son re-enters with news that Utrecht has fallen, and Leidenberch has been taken prisoner. He urges his father to capitulate to the Prince. Barnavelt says he would rather die.

Act 3, Scene 2: The Hague: Council Chambers for the Lords of the State
The Prince of Orange tells Vandort and Bredero that, even though Barnavelt is his personal enemy, he will allow him to retain his Council seat as long as he remains a friend to the State. Vandort and Bredero protest that Barnavelt should be excluded from the council. As the meeting gets under way, the Prince and the Lords of the State discuss the extent to which the Arminian rebels still threaten the State. The Prince says that the reduction of the armed towns has done much to stamp out the sect, but that powerful men who remain untouched are its real source of strength. Pressed by the council to reveal their names, he accuses Modesbargen, Groitus, Leidenberch, and finally Barnavelt. Although Leidenberch has been captured, the councilors note that it will be difficult to make a case against the other conspirators without the testimony of Modesbargen, who has fled to his ancestral castle in Germany. The Prince summons a captain and dispatches him to Germany with orders to quietly arrest Modesbargen while he is out hunting and bring him back to The Hague (the arrest must be kept quiet in order to avoid disrupting the peace with Germany). Next, Leidenberch is brought before the council, vows to deliver a full confession, and is sent back to his cell. His young son begs for permission to accompany him in prison in order to care for him. The Council grants the request. The Prince closes the meeting. Vandort vows to conduct a comprehensive investigation of the rebel action.

Act 3, Scene 3: The Hague: Outside Council Chambers for the Lords of the State
In a short discussion, two captains discuss the council's compassionate treatment of Leidenberch. They also predict that the other conspirators will be captured soon.

Act 3, Scene 2: The Hague: Leidenberch's prison cell
Barnavelt visits Leidenberch in prison. Leidenberch tells Barnavelt that he has made a full confession of the conspirators' activities. Barnavelt angrily berates him for his weakness and faithlessness. But when Leidenberch apologizes, he switches to a gentler tone, and eventually persuades him that the only honorable way out of the situation is suicide. Leidenberch resolves to kill himself that evening.

Act 3, Scene 5: The Hague: Groitus in conference with Hogerbeets
In a short discussion, Groitus and Hogerbeets (two of Barnavelt's last remaining friends) worry about Barnavelt's increasingly tenuous situation. They vow to burn down the Statehouse if Barnavelt is arrested.

Act 3, Scene 6: The Hague: Leidenberch's prison cell
In prison, Leidenberch's young son begs Leidenberch to go to bed, Leidenberch says he must stay up and write. He gives the boy a hug and a kiss and tells him to go to sleep. The boy is frightened by his father's uncharacteristic tenderness and begins to cry as he exits. After delivering a mournful soliloquy on the pain of leaving his son, Leidenberch stabs himself and dies. The noise awakens his son, who enters to find his father dead. He calls for the Provost and servants, who enter immediately. The Provost orders the servants to take the body away.

Act 4, Scene 1: Germany: Outside of Modesbargen's ancestral castle
A captain and some soldiers stake out the grounds around Modesbargen's ancestral castle, waiting for him to go hunting so that they can seize him. Modesbargen enters with some huntsmen. In a short speech, he says that he has grown to love country living and calls himself a fool for participating in political schemes. A huntsman enters to report that scouts on horses have been spotted around the castle grounds. Modesbargen tries to get away, but the captain and soldiers overtake him and arrest him. Modesbargen asks the captain to shoot him, but the captain refuses. He says that Modesbargen will be taken back to the Hague to be tried.

Act 4, Scene 2: The Hague: The Prince in conference with Bredero and Vandort
The Prince discusses Leidenberch's suicide with Bredero and Vandort. The Prince says that, despite this setback, they must move swiftly to prosecute the insurrectionists without being swayed by the force of public opinion. Bredero notes that Groitus and Hogerbeets have threatened to revolt if Barnavelt is arrested. The Prince says that he will not be cowed by such threats, and reveals that he has already dispatched troops to keep Barnavelt's remaining supporters in check.

Act 4, Scene 3: The Hague: Barnavelt in his study
In his study, Barnavelt goes over the many letters of thanks he has received from heads of state and other dignitaries during his distinguished career. In an extremely dark mood, he notes that, like all of his great accomplishments, he too will soon pass away into nothing. A servant enters. Barnavelt is startled, and mistakes the servant for an assassin. When he settles down, the servant tells him that his wife wants him to come to supper. Barnavelt says that he is too depressed to eat. Next, Barnavelt's daughter enters to urge him to come to dinner. He responds with a bitter rant about his decreased fortunes. Finally, Barnavelt's wife enters and tries to cheer him up. He continues with his despairing tirade, desperately wondering what will become of his wife and daughter when he is gone. Barnavelt's son enters to deliver the news of Leidenberch's suicide. Barnavelt suddenly realizes that any charge The Prince might have against him will collapse for lack of a witness. His mood lightens and he regains confidence in his powers. He calls for food and drink and tells his son to invite his friends over for a feast so he can shore up support. But just as he has reached the height of elation, the Prince's men burst into his home to arrest him. Barnavelt angrily rebukes the captain for invading his home and says that he will report to the Council of his own volition, but the captain insists on taking him away as a prisoner.

Act 4, Scene 4: The Hague: the street outside of Barnavelt's house; the Prince confers with a captain above
The captain who captured Modesbargen tells the Prince that Modesbargen has been brought to The Hague in secret. The Prince tells him to offer Modesbargen amnesty in return for his testimony at Barnavelt's trial. Some citizens enter (below) and begin decorating the doors of houses with flowers, a 'Keramis-time' tradition (Kerstmis is the Dutch Christmas, but Barnavelt was tried in the summer; the detail seems to have been thrown in to add a bit of local colour). The citizens purposefully decorate Barnavelt's house just as well as any other, despite his imprisonment, to show their support. One of the citizens mentions rumors that the courts will find Barnavelt guilty and cut off his head. Another citizen dismisses these rumors, and says that Barnavelt has many powerful friends who will protect him. All of the citizens join in a song of encouragement outside of the Barnavelt household. Barnavelt's wife appears at a window above and thanks them.

Act 4, Scene 5: The Hague: a courtroom; Barnavelt's trial
At Barnavelt's trial, Vandort says that Barnavelt must be brought to justice, despite his popularity. Barnavelt is led into the courtroom, and the charges against him are read. He denies all of the charges vigorously, and asks why a man who had worked so hard to defend the State would want to undermine it, as his accusers suggest. He charges the council with forgetfulness and ungratefulness (by now a very familiar theme). The Prince of Orange says that Barnavelt is very good at recalling his services to the state, but has glossed over the spottier moments in his recent record. He calls for Modesbargen's testimony. Startled, Barnavelt realizes that all will be lost if Modesbargen testifies against him. The Prince notes the sudden change in Barnavelt's demeanor. Modesbargen is brought in. He confirms all of the charges and encourages Barnavelt to make amends. Barnavelt says that Modesbargen might be guilty, but his own conscience is perfectly clear. Modesbargen is led out. The councilors call Barnavelt an impudent liar and introduce several letters further attesting to guilt. Barnavelt says that all of the evidence against him is false, and that he is the victim of a conspiracy. Rather than pleading for mercy, he says that he will insist on his innocence until the very end.

Act 5, Scene 1: The Hague: outside the courtroom cell where Barnavelt is held; the courtroom
Barnavelt's servant tells Barnavelt's wife and daughter that they will not be permitted into the prison for a visit. Barnavelt's wife worries that her husband is already dead. The servant assures her that he is still alive, but in a miserably reduced state. Barnavelt's wife says that she will petition Barnavelt's powerful friends for assistance. She give the servant a basket of pears to pass along to Barnavelt and exits with the daughter. The servant begs the prison Provost for permission to pass the pears along to Barnavelt. The Provost takes one of the pears for himself and says Barnavelt will get the rest. The servant thanks him and exits. The Provost's wife enters. The Provost tells her to go home and gives her a pear. As she begins to eat the pear, however, he notices that there is a note hidden inside. The Prince enters with William, Bredero, and Vandort (somewhere around this point, the scene shifts to the courtroom proper). The Provost gives him the note. It says: "You have friends left, and therefore Sir, despair not" (with an intentional pun on 'pear'?). Bredero and Vandort say that justice must not be subverted by Barnavelt's supporters. The Prince notes that the entire continent is watching the trial and that it would sully their reputation if they did not act on the clear evidence that has been presented at court. The French ambassadors, Boisise and Morier, enter with Barnavelt's wife and daughter and deliver lengthy pleas on Barnavelt's behalf. The Prince gives them a respectful, diplomatic response, but stops short of promising amnesty. The ambassadors exit. Vandort says that support for Barnavelt has grown dangerously strong, fueled by rumor and affection. Guards bring Barnavelt in for sentencing. Bredero asks him if he is prepared to confess. Barnavelt says that he has already said everything he wants to say, and that his conscience is clear. Vandort says that, in that case, he will be executed on the following day. The guards take him away. The Prince says that the entire world will know of the justice their court has dared to accomplish. Vandort says that, to show the public that Leidenberch did not manage to escape justice by committing suicide, his corpse will be dug up and hung on the public gallows alongside Barnavelt.

Act 5, Scene 2: The Hague: the executioners from Harlem, Leyden, and Utrecht confer
In a short, darkly humorous scene, the executioners from Harlem, Leyden, and Utrecht throw dice to see who is going to get the privilege of executing Barnavelt. The executioner from Utrecht wins. He joyfully tells his colleagues how he will go about his business: first, he will fake a few tears so that Barnavelt will give him some money, then he will cry like the devil as he folds up Barnavelt's clothes and affixes the blindfold. Then, just as Barnavelt is in the middle of a prayer, he will lop off his head. He encourages his friends to join him in a song to celebrate his luck.

Act 5, Scene 3: The Hague: the scaffold, site of Barnavelt's execution
As they wait for Barnavelt at the scaffold, a captain and soldiers discuss Barnavelt's situation. The soldier wonders if the court actually intends to kill Barnavelt, or only wants to scare him. The captain says that Barnavelt has been proven guilty, and must therefore be executed or the State will look weak. The prison Provost enters with the executioners. They are followed by soldiers carrying a gibbet and Leidenberch's body in a coffin. At the Provost's command, the soldiers remove Leidenberch's decaying body from the coffin and hang it on the gibbet. The executioners make jokes about the terrible smell. Finally, Barnavelt is ushered in and ascends the scaffold making brave declarations of his fearlessness and clarity of conscience. He greets the executioner and asks him where he his from. The executioner tells him that he is from Utrecht, and that he won the privilege of executing Barnavelt by playing dice. Barnavelt is depressed to hear that his life has been toyed with so carelessly, but thanks the executioner all the same. Glancing around, he notices Leidenberch's corpse hanging on the gibbet. He is shocked and disgusted, but remains unbowed. He delivers a final speech reminding onlookers of his service to the State, and says that he is dying for an ungrateful country. One of the attending lords calls him a misguided zealot and compares him to the perpetrators of the Gunpowder Plot. Barnavelt continues talking until the very end. As planned, the executioner lops off his head while he is in the middle of a prayer: "I come, I come: o gracious heaven: now: now: / Now I present—[head struck off]" (5.3.182-3). A line from another Lord ends the play on a somber note: "farewell, great hart: full low thy strength now lyes, / He that would purge ambition this way dies" (5.3.189-90).

== Stagecraft ==
The beheading of Barnavelt was acted out onstage, which raises obvious questions of how this was done in Jacobean stagecraft. In the play the headsman chops off not only Barnavelt's head, but a few of his fingers; as the text puts it, "you have struck his fingers too / But we forgive your haste."
