= John Thompson (actor) =

John Thompson (died December 1634) was a noted boy player acting women's roles in English Renaissance theatre. He served in the King's Men, the acting troupe formerly of William Shakespeare and Richard Burbage.

Thompson's career is notable for his length. Some boy actors, like John Honyman and Stephen Hammerton, filled female roles for only three to five years before switching to male roles; others, like Richard Sharpe, appear to have continued in women's roles for a decade. Thompson is known to have played women for at least ten years, if not more.

== Early life ==
Thompson began as an apprentice of veteran comedian and teacher John Shank. In 1636, Shank claimed in legal testimony to have spent £40 to acquire Thompson as an apprentice. (Apprentices' contracts were sometimes purchased from their "masters", as with the case of Stephen Hammerton.)

According to the cast list in the 1623 first edition of Webster's The Duchess of Malfi, Thompson played Julia, the "Cardinals Mis". This is Thompson's earliest known part.

The cast list refers to two separate productions, the original of c. 1614 and a revival of c. 1621. When different actors played a role in the two stagings, the list identifies them: the parts of Ferdinand, the Cardinal, and Antonio were filled by different actors in the two productions. The cast list gives the role of the Cardinal's mistress Julia to Thompson in both productions; but this has been greeted with skepticism by some commentators, who think Thompson played the role only in the revival of c. 1621. About 1614 is an early date for the start of Thompson's career, but it is not impossible, and no evidence contradicts the idea.

== Career ==
Thompson's last known female role was as Panopia in the company's production of Wilson's The Swisser in 1631. In between he had roles in Ford's The Lover's Melancholy, and in The Lovers' Progress, The Maid in the Mill, and The Pilgrim, three plays in the canon of John Fletcher and his collaborators. He also played Domitia in The Roman Actor (1626), and Honoria in The Picture (1629), both by Philip Massinger, plus Cleonarda in Carlell's The Deserving Favourite (also 1629) and Miniona Undermine in Clavell's The Soddered Citizen (1630).

Thompson appears to have had a penchant for playing formidable and dominant women, like Honoria the queen or Cleonarda the huntress. More conventionally female roles went to other boy actors. This must reveal something about Thompson's personal characteristics and acting skills. It may also suggest other parts he could likely have taken. For example, no cast information survives for the King's Men's production of Massinger's The Duke of Milan (c. 1622); but Marcelia, the heroine in that play, is another formidable beauty like Cleonarda or Honoria, and a role that Thompson might have played.

== Later life ==
Thompson fades from view after 1631; but the very patchy records of the era may obscure the fact that he simply continued acting. He was named a Groom of the Chamber on 15 April 1633, which certainly suggests a continuing career. (Actors were sometimes rewarded with the honorific post; Honyman was named a Groom of the Chamber along with Thompson, and five King's Men became Grooms in January 1641.)

The parish records of St. Giles without Cripplegate, which was the home of many theatre people of the day and located near the Fortune Playhouse, note two Thompson daughters in 1631 – the christening of Anne on 16 July and the burial of Lettice on 1 October. Thompson's funeral was held in the same parish on 13 December 1634.
