= The Deserving Favourite =

Play written by Lodowick Carlell

The Deserving Favourite is a Caroline era stage play, a tragicomedy written by Lodowick Carlell that was first published in 1629. The earliest of Carlell's plays "and also the best," it is notable for its influence on other plays of the Caroline era.

== Performance and publication ==
The play was first printed in 1629 in a quarto issued by the stationer Matthew Rhodes. (The work was not entered into the Stationers' Register prior to publication. This violation of the rules was unusual, though not unprecedented; the same is true of a few other plays of the era, like Greene's Tu Quoque in 1614, and A Fair Quarrel in 1617.) The title page states that the play had "lately" been acted, first at Court before King Charles I and then "publicly" at the Blackfriars Theatre, by the King's Men.

Carlell dedicated the first edition to two personal friends, Thomas Carey, second son to the Earl of Monmouth, and William Murray. Both were gentlemen of the King's Bedchamber.

A second quarto was issued in 1659 by the stationer, Humphrey Moseley.

== "Vanity" ==
There is no indication just how recent a production that word "lately" might mean, though it could have been in the same year, 1629. This play was an early instance of a phenomenon that came to distinguish the final phase of the King's Men's existence: what can be called "vanity" productions of plays written by courtiers. Previously, the King's Men had chosen their plays on the basis of their appeal to the popular audience; but in the Caroline era they staged more plays by courtiers like Carlell, William Cartwright, Sir John Suckling, and Thomas Killigrew. At least some of these productions were subsidised in varying ways. The plays were sometimes published soon after their premieres in vanity editions, the folio printing of Suckling's Aglaura being the extreme example.

For these courtiers, playwriting "was one of many fields in which one might emerge in virtuoso self-display, and the lengths to which Suckling and others were prepared to go, following the fashion set by Lodowick Carlell's The Deserving Favourite (c. 1629), to have their works publicly performed, is an indication of the new importance of the theater for an aspiring wit."

Carlell's first play served as a model for the courtly tragicomedies that followed it in the 1630s, plays like Sir William Davenant's The Platonick Lovers (1636) and The Fair Favourite (1638) among others, which show the influence of the cult of Platonic love at the court of Queen Henrietta Maria. In his The Unfortunate Lovers (also 1638), Davenant borrows the names of Carlell's lovers, Lysander and Clarinda, for his similar pair of characters.

== Sources ==
Carlell based the plot of his play on a Spanish novel titled La duquesa de Mantua by the popular author Don Alonzo del Castillo Solorzano, first published in 1628 or 1629 (the dates in copies of the first edition vary). The close conjunction of dates suggests that the play's authorship, performances, and publication all followed each other closely in a brief span of time, 1628–29.

== The cast ==
The 1629 quarto provides a cast list of the original production.

Role	Actor
King	Robert Benfield
Duke	Joseph Taylor
Iacomo	John Lowin
Lysander	Richard Sharpe
Count Utrante	Eliard Swanston
Count Orsinio (the Hermit)	Richard Robinson
Gerard	Anthony Smith
Clarinda	John Honyman
Cleonarda	John Thompson
Mariana	Edward Horton

The list yields insight into the workings of the company at the time of the production.

[For other King's Men cast lists of the 1625–35 period, see: The Picture, The Roman Actor, The Swisser.]

== Synopsis ==
In an unnamed country, ruled by an unnamed King, a love triangle prevails among three passionate people. Lysander and Clarinda are deeply in love; but the Duke, the King's powerful cousin, also loves Clarinda and seeks her hand in marriage. (The Duke is the King's "favourite," the prime courtier in his court. He is the "deserving favourite" of the title.) Lysander is indebted to the Duke for the preservation of his "life and fortune" – when Lysander's villainous uncle tried to cheat his nephew of his patrimony, the Duke prevented the injustice. His sense of honour drives Lysander to try to step aside and let the Duke prevail with Clarinda – but the young woman resists this; Lysander is her choice

(The three express their feelings in long passionate speeches, consumed with high-flown notions of love and honour. At one point, even the King gets tired of it all, and urges the Duke to resist his love-sickness: "Call back for shame then / That judgement which had wont to govern all / Your actions...")

Through self-interest and malice, the bad servant Iacomo is motivated to interfere. Lysander tries to drive Clarinda into the Duke's arms by displaying his own unworthiness: he suggests that they can maintain a clandestine love affair after she and the Duke are married. Clarinda is not fooled; she pretends to second the idea and exposes Lysander's manipulation. Iacomo has brought the Duke to eavesdrop, however; and the Duke, hearing the first half of the talk, is outraged. His challenges Lysander to a duel.

The two meet in the forest (one of the forest scenes that are a hallmark of Carlell's drama). In the fight, both are seriously wounded. The princess Cleonarda, the King's sister and an avid huntress, comes upon their bodies; she falls in love with Lysander, and takes him to her hunting lodge to nurse him back to health. She believes the other man is dead; but his body mysteriously disappears when her servants search for it.

Rumor spreads that Lysander has killed the Duke, and the King offers rewards for his capture. Cleonarda nurses Lysander in hiding, and learns that her loves Clarinda; she is torn between her love for him and her admiration for his loyalty to his first affection. Clarinda is called to Lysander's side; she naively tells Iacomo of the plan. Disguised as a boy, Clarinda goes to the forest, guided by Iacomo; but the servant binds her hands and threatens to rape her. She escapes into the woods, and Iacomo goes to tell the King of Lysander's whereabouts.

The bound and boy-disguised Clarinda is rescued by a man she meets in the woods. She fails to recognise that he is the Duke, who has also recovered from his wounds under the care of a forest-dwelling Hermit. Acting on Iacomo's information, the King and his men capture Lysander. Cleonarda reveals her love for him, and tries to obtain her brother's pardon; but the King is determined to execute the man that he believes killed the Duke. On the day of execution, the Duke shows himself still alive.

Lysander is pardoned, and about to marry Clarinda – when the Hermit demands a halt to the wedding. The two young people cannot marry, because they are brother and sister. The Hermit is actually Count Orsinio, Lysander's father – but not his father, since Orsinio informs everyone that Lysander is Clarinda's brother, stolen in infancy. This explains the strong attraction they feel for each other. Since all four characters have been impressed with each other's nobility and honour, they accept the obvious resolution of their difficulties: the Duke and Clarinda agree to marry, as do Lysander and Cleonarda. The King resists the prospect of his sister marrying a subject; but when the two threaten to kill each other over the matter, he relents.

As the Hermit turned out to be Count Orsinio, so Iacomo turns out to be his brother the villainous uncle. He is sent to prison for the rest of his life.

In the Epilogue to the play, Carlell acknowledges that his audience might consider the drama "only full / Of gross absurdities...."

== Distaff sex ==
When Cleonarda and Clarinda meet for the first time, the two women praise each other's beauty, in terms that (to a modern ear at least) sound surprisingly erotic. Lysander later tells Clarinda that after he is executed "You and the Princess may together make / A kind of marriage...." Suggestions of lesbianism crop up curiously in Caroline-era plays, in contrast to earlier phases of English Renaissance drama; they recur in plays by Richard Brome – see The Antipodes, A Mad Couple Well-Match'd, and The Queen's Exchange. James Shirley's The Bird in a Cage contains a comparable element.
