= Women Pleased =

Play by John Fletcher

Women Pleased is a late Jacobean era stage play, a tragicomedy by John Fletcher that was originally published in the first Beaumont and Fletcher folio of 1647.

== Date and performance ==
The play's date is uncertain; it is usually assigned to the 1619–23 period by scholars. It was acted by the King's Men; the cast list added to the play in the second Beaumont and Fletcher folio of 1679 cites Joseph Taylor, Nicholas Tooley, John Lowin, William Ecclestone, John Underwood, Richard Sharpe, Robert Benfield, and Thomas Holcombe – the same cast list as for The Little French Lawyer and The Custom of the Country, two other Fletcherian plays of the same era. The inclusion of Taylor dates the play after the March 1619 death of Richard Burbage.

== Authorship ==
As he often did, Fletcher depended on a Spanish source for the plot of his play; in this case, Grisel y Mirabella (c. 1495) by Juan de Flores supplied part of the main plot. He also appears to have been influenced by Geoffrey Chaucer's The Wife of Bath's Tale from The Canterbury Tales for the riddle which Silvio is set to solve by the Duchess within a year's time as well as Belvidere's disguise as an old hag and demand to marry him as boon for providing him with the answer to the riddle. Fletcher drew material for the subplot from three tales in the Decameron of Boccaccio, another dependable resource. Scholars attribute the play to Fletcher alone, since his characteristic pattern of stylistic and textual preferences is continuous throughout the text; but some critics favor the view that the extant text is a revision by Fletcher of an earlier play of his own authorship. See his Monsieur Thomas for a comparable case of Fletcher revising himself. He also borrowed from himself: Women Pleased shares a plot point (the heroine dressing up as an old woman to influence the plot) that also occurs in The Pilgrim, in a way that suggests Women Pleased is the earlier work.

In subject matter and source material, Fletcher's play parallels the anonymous drama Swetnam the Woman-Hater, which was first printed in 1620. It is unclear which play had priority over the other.

== After 1660 ==
Like many of Fletcher's plays, Women Pleased was revived during the Restoration era; Samuel Pepys saw it on 26 December 1668. David Garrick would borrow from Fletcher's play for his pantomime A Christmas Tale, staged at Drury Lane in 1773.

== Synopsis ==
Set in Florence, the play focuses its main plot on the love match between its protagonists, Silvio and Belvidere. Belvidere is the daughter and only child of the reigning Duchess, and so a highly desirable marital partner; when the Duke of Milan, one of her suitors, goes so far as to try to kidnap her, the Duchess's guards drive his party off by force. Belvidere is then lodged in the duchy's fortress, where she can be protected; but she is now isolated from Silvio and other would-be suitors. Silvio exploits a family connection – the wife of the citadel's keeper is his aunt – to meet his beloved; but he is caught and brought before the angry Duchess. (As a mere private gentleman, Silvio is not considered a fit partner for the duchy's heir.) Silvio faces a penalty of death; but the two lovers compete to claim responsibility before the council that tries Silvio, leaving the judges confused. The Duchess decides to be merciful, and banishes Silvio for a year; she furthermore gives Silvio a chance at marrying Belvidere – if he can solve the riddle she poses him.

With Silvio gone, Belvidere pretends to be cured of her infatuation with him; she seems to acquiesce to her mother's plan to marry her to the Duke of Siena. (In the process, Belvidere discovers the riddle and its answer from her mother.) Before the arranged marriage can take place, however, Belvidere vanishes from the court. The Duke of Siena, feeling he's been played for a fool, withdraws in anger and prepares a military response.

Silvio wanders about the country in disguise; he consults "Diviners, dreamers, schoolmen, deep magicians" in search of an answer to the Duchess's riddle, but without much success. In the countryside, he falls in with a set of farm people and morris dancers; he also meets an old woman who claims special insight, and who he considers a Sibyl. The old woman, in fact, is Belvidere in disguise. She advises Silvio to join the fight against the invading Duke of Siena; he does so, and becomes the great hero of the Florentine victory when he captures the Duke.

The old Sibyl (Belvidere in disguise) advises Silvio to turn himself in to the Duchess's authorities; she assures him that she will preserve him and unite him with Belvidere, and in gratitude he promises to grant whatever "boon" she shall ask of him. Silvio arrives at court, and proves he is the man who secured the victory with the bejeweled cameo portrait of Belvidere that he took from the Duke of Siena. When he reveals his identity, however, the Duchess is ready to have him executed. Silvio reminds the Duchess of their riddle bargain; and she, confident of her position, allows him to venture a solution – which Belvidere has provided him.

The play's riddle is a version of one that recurs through traditional literature and folklore; in its simplest form, the riddle's question is "What does a woman want?" The play states its version of the riddle in verse, and adds an ironic and contradictory twist to it:

Tell me what is that only thing

For which all women long;

Yet having what they most desire,

To have it does them wrong.

The answer to the traditional riddle is that "A woman wants to have her will" – in modern terms, to have her own way. The play is faithful to its folklore source:

...in good or ill,

They desire to have their will;

Yet when they have it, they abuse it,

For they know not how to use it.

In producing the correct answer, Silvio has won...but no one knows the whereabouts of Belvidere. The old Sibyl throws another twist into the plot: she demands, as her "boon," that Silvio marry her. The Duchess and the Duke of Siena are delighted at this twist, feeling that Silvio is being taught his lesson; SIlvio, though tortured by his apparent fate, proves to be a man of honor and agrees to the marriage...which turns out perfectly well once Belvidere reveals her true identity. The Duchess consoles the disappointed Duke of Siena by marrying him herself; in the end, both mother and daughter are "women pleased."

(The scenes in the country provide an element of satire against the Puritans who were hostile to stage plays and to traditional celebrations of many types, including Morris dancing. The dancer who was set to dance the hobby horse is a convert to Puritanism who refuses the role on religious grounds; there is a good deal of ridiculous back-and-forth, attacking and defending "This beast of Babylon...The hopeful hobby horse.")

The play's subplot involves that staple of comedy, a rich old miser married to a beautiful young wife. Lopez, a "sordid userer," is jealous of his wife Isabella, who is pursued by two would-be seducer/adulterers; one is the elderly Bartello, the commander of the city's fortress (who supplies a connection between main plot and subplot); the second and more serious seducer is a handsome young gallant who calls himself "Rugio." Rugio has a servant named Soto who provides much of the play's comic material. (Soto is a stock thin-man or "lean fool" figure, common in the dramas of the King's Men; see the entry on John Shank for details.) The subplot features the elements typical of its kind of humor, with characters hiding behind tapestries and even up chimneys to avoid discovery. In the end, Isabella seems tempted by Rugio but stands firm as a chaste wife; and Rugio reveals himself to be Isabella's brother Claudio in disguise. The subplot constitutes one of the "chastity tests" that are such a regular and striking feature in Fletcher's plays.

== Evaluations ==
"Women Pleased is an excellent example of Fletcher's composite art, whereby tragicomedy and a variety of the comedy of manners, trespassing on absolute farce, are not unhappily wedded together into an entertainment which could not but have been very effective in the hands of a skillful troupe." So thought Schelling; other critics have been less complimentary.
