= Richard Sharpe (actor) =

Richard Sharpe (c. 1602 [?] – January 1632) was an actor with the King's Men, the leading theatre troupe of its time and the company of William Shakespeare and Richard Burbage. Sharpe began his career as a boy player acting female roles, then switched to male roles in his young adulthood.

== The Duchess of Malfi ==
Sharpe's earliest known role was, arguably, both his most significant and his most controversial. The first edition of John Webster's The Duchess of Malfi, printed in 1623, contains the earliest cast list in English Renaissance drama. The list states that Sharpe originated the title role of the Duchess.

The 1623 cast list actually covers two separate productions, the premiere staging and a later revival.

- The original starred Richard Burbage and is usually dated to c. 1614. It must have occurred prior to William Ostler's death in December 1614, since Ostler played the role of Antonio.
- The revival production starred Burbage's replacement Joseph Taylor, and so must have taken place after Burbage's March 1619 death. Scholars date it to c. 1621.

The cast list holds that Sharpe played the Duchess in both of these productions; he would have been perhaps 12 years old for the first, and about 19 for the second (though the dates of both the productions and of Sharpe's birth are not certain). Some commentators blanche at the idea of a 12-year-old boy playing such a prominent woman's role; and some have assigned the part in the first production to the more experienced Richard Robinson, or to Alexander Cooke, the veteran who is thought by some to have originated many Shakespearean heroines. (Cooke, however, died in February 1614, necessitating an earlier date for the original production.)

The subject of boy players in female roles is controversial and long-disputed. A cautious approach would rely on the testimony of the evidentiary record, which assigns the role of the Duchess of Malfi to Sharpe.

== Other roles ==
Sharpe originated other female roles in ensuing years. the cast lists added to the second Beaumont and Fletcher folio of 1679 credit Sharpe with parts in the King's Men's premiere productions of:

- The Custom of the Country
- The Double Marriage
- The False One
- The Humorous Lieutenant
- The Island Princess
- The Knight of Malta
- The Laws of Candy
- The Little French Lawyer
- The Lovers' Progress
- The Loyal Subject
- The Mad Lover
- The Prophetess
- Women Pleased

— in the 1616–24 era.

Sharpe "probably became a sharer in the King's Men in 1624" — that is, a partner in the company rather than a mere hired player. Sharpe then switched from important female roles to important male roles — a transition that some boy players (like Robinson or Stephen Hammerton) executed more successfully than others (like John Honyman). Sharpe played Parthenius in the company's production of Philip Massinger's The Roman Actor (1626), Ferdinand the general in the same author's The Picture (1629), Lysander in Lodowick Carlell's The Deserving Favourite (also 1629), Wittworth in John Clavell's The Soddered Citizen (1630), and the King of the Lombards in Arthur Wilson's The Swisser (1631).

== Son ==
Parish records testify to the brief existence of Sharpe's illegitimate son Richard; as the record puts it, he was "base born of the body of Margaret Smith singlewoman...." The infant was christened on 6 September 1631, and buried eleven days later, on 17 September; his mother was a servant.

== Death ==
Sharpe's death followed that of his son by four months; he was buried in the parish of St. Anne Blackfriars on 25 January 1632, aged 30.
