= The Prophetess (play) =

Stage play by John Fletcher and Philip Massinger

The Prophetess is a late Jacobean era stage play, a tragicomedy written by John Fletcher and Philip Massinger. It was initially published in the first Beaumont and Fletcher folio of 1647.

== Date and performance ==
The play was licensed for performance by Sir Henry Herbert, the Master of the Revels, on 14 May 1622. It was acted by the King's Men; the cast included John Lowin, Joseph Taylor, Robert Benfield, Nicholas Tooley, John Shank, George Birch, Richard Sharpe, and Thomas Holcombe.

== Authorship ==
Due to Fletcher's distinctive stylistic profile, the division of authorship in the play is largely clear and unambiguous. Cyrus Hoy gave this breakdown of the two writers' relative shares:

Fletcher – Act I; Act III, Act V, scene 3;
Massinger – Act II; Act IV; Act V, scenes 1 and 2.

E. H. C. Oliphant provided the same scheme, except for an assignment of V,2 to Fletcher. Massinger may have revised the original play in 1629, for a revival in July of that year. One source of the play's plot is the History of Carinus of Flavius Vopiscus. (Massinger had previously dealt with the reign of Diocletian in The Virgin Martyr, his collaboration with Dekker.)

== Adaptation ==
The Prophetess was revived by Thomas Betterton in 1690, in a musical adaptation "After the Manner of an Opera," with music by Henry Purcell; that version is sometimes known by the title Dioclesian. Betterton and Purcell's adaptation was performed in Dublin late in 1735.

== Critical response ==
The Prophetess has been called "a strange and difficult play," noteworthy as almost the only work in Fletcher's canon that treats magic and thaumaturgy as a serious element, with Delphia "as a kind of a curiously feminized Prospero."

The 19th-century Romantic critic Coleridge regarded The Prophetess as that work of Fletcher's which, more than any other, "realized the Ideal of Anti-Shakesperianism," citing its flat characters and moral ambiguity.

== Synopsis ==
In the 1647 folio, The Prophetess is called a "Tragical History." At one point in the drama, the Chorus states that the play provides "Historie, / yet mixt...with sweet varietie" (IV, i). The plot certainly does offer historical information (some fairly accurate, some wildly not), intermingled with borrowings from folklore, legend, and fairy tale. The story begins in 284 A.D., with the reputedly historical murder of Numerian (the play calls him Numerianus) by Lucius Flavius Aper (in the play, Volutius Aper). In the opening scene, the emperor Charinus and his sister Aurelia discuss their brother's reported murder. They decide to offer a munificent reward to the man who kills Aper – co-rulership of the Roman Empire and Aurelia's hand in marriage. (This is a classic fairy-tale element – "half my kingdom and the hand of my daughter" – and wholly ahistorical).

At this point, Diocles is a common soldier, who is spending his best efforts killing wild boars; the witch/sorceress Delphia has prophesied that Diocles will become emperor when his kills a certain boar. The prophecy comes with a condition: Diocles will also marry Delphia's niece Drusilla, who is deeply in love with him. When Diocles complains that he still is not emperor despite all the boars he's killed, Delphia merely tells him that he hasn't yet got the right one. Then Diocles learns of the bounty placed on Aper's head, and gets the point of the prophecy: aper is the Latin term for a wild boar. Diocles kills Aper, and receives his reward: upon ascending to the highest place in the empire, he amends his name to Dioclesianus.

But he has conveniently forgotten about Drusilla, and plans to marry Aurelia. Delphia doesn't like this. She reproves his faithlessness, but Dioclesian is recalcitrant; in the early scenes of the play he acts with the egomania and bombast of Marlowe's Tamburlaine. Delphia's magic is so powerful, however, that she can spoil the hero's good fortune. A sudden storm of thunder and lightning, caused by Delphia, forces the superstitious Romans to delay the wedding; then Delphia's spells make Aurelia fall in love with Dioclesian's nephew Maximinian. (Maximinian is based on the historical Maximian, Diocletian's co-ruler but no familial relation.) Dioclesian rages at Delphia's interference, but events forestall any action on his part.

In their long-running conflict with the Persians, the Romans have captured the Persian princess Cassana, sister of the king, Cosroe. (The historical Khosrau I ruled nearly three centuries after the historical period of the play, 531–579 A.D.; his presence here constitutes the drama's biggest departure from historical fact. "Cosroe" is a stereotypical Persian emperor of much Western literature; he appears in Tamburlaine and in other plays and operas.) Aurelia uses the captured princess as her servant. Persian ambassadors try to ransom Cassana, but the proud Aurelia dismisses even the highest offers. Desperate, the Persian ambassadors manage (with Delphia's magic help) to abduct Charinus, Aurelia, and Maximinian and take them into Persian custody. Dioclesian rushes with his army to rescue them; by this time, though, he has learned to moderate his egotism and ambition. He is victorious over the Persians on the battlefield, yet with uncharacteristic magnanimity he pardons and releases Cosroe and Cassana, and then surprises all by abdicating his position in favor of his nephew Maximinian. Dioclesian marries Drusilla and retires to a farm in Lombardy.

Maximinian is now co-ruler with Charinus, but the two come into conflict. Maximinian believes that his own rule will never be secure as long as Dioclesian lives: the soldiers admire the abdicated uncle more than the nephew in power. In the play's climax, Maximinian leads his troops against Dioclesian; but an apparent divine intervention (Delphia-inspired) – earthquake, thunder, lightning, and a godly hand in the clouds – turns Maximinian repentant. Dioclesian and Drusilla are left to enjoy their country retirement, unmolested.

The play's comic relief is supplied by the clown character Geta, a servant and follower of Dioclesian who is promoted to an officer, without any of the qualities that would qualify him for the position.

The play's departures from historical fact are almost too many to list. The actual Maximian was Diocletian's co-ruler, not his heir; Carinus died in 285, before Maximian was elevated to Caesarship; Maximian retired at the same time as Diocletian; when he became emperor, Diocletian was not a common soldier but a consul; Diocletian retired to Dalmatia, not Lombardy; etc. etc. The play contains surprisingly old-fashioned features for a work of the 1620s; its chorus, dumbshow, and Marlovain bombast suggest a work of the previous generation of dramas. It is possible that The Prophetess is a reworking of the lost play Diocletian from 1594.

The play contains spectacular elements; critics have wondered exactly how the entrance of Delphia and Drusilla in II, iii, "in a Throne drawn by Dragons," could have been staged.
