= John Honyman =

17th-century English actor

John Honyman (1613 – April 1636), also Honeyman, Honiman, Honnyman, or other variants, was an English actor of the Caroline era. He was a member of the King's Men, the most prominent playing company of its era, best known as the company of William Shakespeare and Richard Burbage.

Honyman belonged to the generation that followed Shakespeare and Burbage. He was christened on 7 February 1613, in the parish of St. Botolph's, Bishopsgate. An apprentice of John Shank, he started his career as a boy player filling female roles; in his teens he was playing leading female parts, Domitilla in The Roman Actor (1626) and Sophia in The Picture (1629), both plays by Philip Massinger, and Clarinda in Lodowick Carlell's The Deserving Favourite (also 1629).

Some boy actors of Honyman's era made successful transitions from filling lead female roles as boys to lead male roles as young men; Stephen Hammerton and Richard Sharpe are two examples of this successful transition. John Honyman illustrates the opposite phenomenon, in that he graduated to only rather minor roles as a young adult. He played the servingman Sly in John Clavell's The Soddered Citizen (1630), and the First Merchant in Massinger's Believe as You List (1631). In the 1632 King's Men's revival of John Fletcher's The Wild Goose Chase, he filled the minor part of "Young Man disguised as a Factor."

Honyman was made a Groom of the Chamber on 15 April 1633, along with John Thompson. His potential development in his craft was cut short by his early death. He was buried on 13 April 1636. His last will and testament, drawn up six days earlier on 7 April (Robert Benfield was one of the witnesses), leaves bequests to his mother, father, and brother, his fellow actors, and the poor of his parish, St. Giles without Cripplegate. Thomas Jordan published an elegy on Honyman in his Love's Dialact (1646).

Honyman also appears to have been among the minority of actors who wrote one or more plays. Sir Aston Cockayne left a 10-line poem "To Mr. John Hunnieman" that extols his "Successful pen and fortunate fantasy" and even compares Honyman to Shakespeare. Yet nothing is known of Honyman's dramas, not even their titles.
