= The Wild Goose Chase =

Play written by John Fletcher c. 1621

The Wild Goose Chase is a late Jacobean stage play, a comedy written by John Fletcher, first performed in 1621. It is often classed among Fletcher's most effective and best-constructed plays; Edmund Gosse called it "one of the brightest and most coherent of Fletcher's comedies, a play which it is impossible to read and not be in a good humour." The drama's wit, sparkle, and urbanity anticipated and influenced the Restoration comedy of the later decades of the seventeenth century. The term "wild-goose chase" is first documented when used by Shakespeare in the early 1590s, but appears as a term with which his audience would be familiar, as there is no attempt to define its meaning.

== History ==
Firm data on the play's date of authorship and early performance history have not survived. "In the absence of evidence to the contrary, the year 1621 is a plausible date." "No one has ever questioned Fletcher's sole authorship of this play..."; his distinctive style is continuous throughout. The play was omitted from the first Beaumont and Fletcher folio of 1647, although it was noted in that volume as a lost work of Fletcher's canon. When a manuscript was later recovered, the play was published in 1652 by Humphrey Moseley, one of the publishers of the 1647 folio. Moseley published the text in a folio format – highly unusual (although not wholly unprecedented) for a single play – precisely because Moseley wanted to give buyers and readers the opportunity to have the new play bound into their copies of the 1647 folio. This was a strategy that Moseley adopted in other cases; the challenging effort to produce collected editions of playwrights' dramas in the chaotic world of English Renaissance theatre sometimes necessitated such approaches. The play was later included in the second Beaumont and Fletcher folio of 1679.

== First edition ==
The Wild Goose Chase is given an elaborate presentation in the 1652 edition. The play is prefaced by five commendatory poems, including a 54-line encomium by Richard Lovelace. The characters in the list of Dramatis personae are given fulsome descriptions; De Gard, for example, is summarized as "A Noble stay'd Gentleman that being newly lighted from his Travels, assists his sister Oriana in her chase of Mirabel the Wild-Goose." A cast list for a King's Men's production of the play is included, with similarly rich and plumb descriptions; the part of Mirabel was "Incomparably Acted by Mr. Joseph Taylor," while the part of Belleur was "Most naturally Acted by Mr. John Lowin," and Pinac "Admirably well Acted by Mr. Thomas Pollard." The full cast list provides these assignments:

De Gard	Robert Benfield
La Castre	Richard Robinson
Mirabel	Joseph Taylor
Pinac	Thomas Pollard
Belleur	John Lowin
Nantolet	William Penn
Lugier	Eliard Swanston
Oriana	Stephen Hammerton
Rosaura	William Trigg
Lillia-Bianca	Alexander Gough
Petella	John Shank
Factor	John Honyman

The actors Gough and Trigg, and their roles, are bracketed together, so that the list does not indicate with absolute certainty which actor played which role. The cast list refers not to the original production c. 1621, but to a revival in 1632, after the boy player Stephen Hammerton had joined the company. The play was revised sometime after its creation, perhaps for the 1632 revival; the text shows the kind of discontinuities that indicate some interference with the author's original. (One example: in Act III, scene i, a character named Mr. Illiard enters, but speaks no lines, and is present nowhere else in the play.)

The 1652 volume's dedication, "To the Honour'd Few, Lovers of Dramatick Poesy," was signed by Taylor and Lowin. The financial proceeds from the volume went to those two veteran actors, who, like many of their compatriots, had fallen on hard times after the theatres were closed in 1642 at the start of the English Civil War.

== After 1660 ==
Fletcher's play was popular. It was revived early in the Restoration era and often was presented. Samuel Pepys saw it in January 1668. The name of Fletcher's protagonist, Mirabel, was adopted by William Congreve for his hero in The Way of the World (1700); and Sir Richard Steele employed it for a character in The Spectator.

George Farquhar adapted Fletcher's play into his The Inconstant (1702; published 1714). Farquhar's version was acted at Covent Garden and Drury Lane, by David Garrick and Charles Kemble and other leading men of the century. Farquhar's text was in turn adapted and updated by others, and in various forms was staged well into the nineteenth century, in New York as late as 1889.

Fletcher's original was revived by ESPlayers for a production at the White Bear theatre in Kennington from 14 June – 3 July 2011. The production was also seen in Fletcher's home town of Rye on 9 July. This marked the first professional production of a Fletcher play in the town of his birth.

The play was again performed on 7 July 2013, in Staunton, VA, by the American Shakespeare Center's summer theater camp. The show was reduced to one hour in length, and the actors ranged in age from 13 to 18. Directed by A. J. Sclafani, 17-year-old Aric Floyd starred as Mirabel.

== Synopsis ==
The play is set in Paris, and opens with French travelers returning from their time abroad in Italy. De Gard comes to see his sister Oriana, who has been living as the ward of a gentleman named La Castre – an arrangement Oriana chose because she is in love with La Castre's son Mirabel. Three years earlier, before setting out on his travels, Mirabel had offered marriage to Oriana; now, she is eighteen, he is returned home, and she wants him to fulfill his commitment to her. De Gard, who came to know the mercurial and willful Mirabel in Italy, warns his sister against expecting too much; but Oriana is determined. As she puts it plainly, "My thing is marriage."

Mirabel's father La Castre also wants to see his son married, but looks to arrange a more lucrative match for him. When Mirabel reaches Paris with his two friends, Pinac and Belleur, La Castre introduces him to Rosalura and Lillia-Bianca, the two daughters of the wealthy Nantolet. Yet Mirabel finds neither young woman to his taste. His two friends are more interested; since opposites attract, the big but bashful Belleur is drawn to the bold and outgoing Rosalura, while the merry Pinac decides to court her serious and intellectual sister.

The straightforward Oriana confronts Mirabel directly, reminding him of his promise, and asks him if he intends to honor it. And Mirabel, just as directly, tells her that he doesn't; for him, oaths and promises are mere words and air. He shows her his own version of a little black book, in which he records all his romantic affairs, and says, "I have tales of all sorts for all sorts of women." He tells her, frankly and shamelessly, that he will not marry her. Oriana leaves in tears. Her offended brother de Gard comes close to challenging Mirabel to a duel, but reflects that this may only discredit his sister the more; he recognizes Mirabel as "A glorious talker, and a legend maker / Of idle tales, and trifles," whose words cannot be taken seriously by serious men.

Pinac and Belleur try to pursue Nantolet's daughters, but find the going very rough; the two young women seem to switch personalities in the process. Belleur meets Rosalura again, but finds her haughty and distant; he's so distressed by his poor showing as a wooer that he storms out looking for a fight, threatening to "beat all men." Lillia-Bianca surprises Pinac by turning effervescent; she exhausts him with dancing and singing, and leaves him frazzled and confused. It turns out that both young women are under the curious tutelage of a man named Lugier, and have enacted the "taught behaviors" he espouses; but both want husbands, and neither is happy with their result so far. The three of them, however, are united in their dislike of the conceited Mirabel; and Lugier claims he can help Oriana to obtain her desires and humble the arrogant man in the bargain. He stages a charade in which a disguised De Gard pretends to be Oriana's new love, a Savoyard lord, wealthy and powerful. Mirabel is taken in at first; but a servant abused by Lugier gives away the plot. The wild goose escapes.

Pinac and Belleur try stratagems to regain the initiative with the ladies. Belleur acts the braggadocio, quarreling with everyone and attempting to overawe Rosalura by sheer intimidation; it seems to work – until a crowd of Rosalura's female friends jeer and ridicule him unmercifully, calling him a "mighty dairymaid in men's clothes" and "Some tinker's trull with a beard glued on." Belleur is so upset he seems half-crazed; he demands that strangers ridicule and kick him in the street. Pinac pretends to have obtained a prestigious and advantageous new love, an English gentlewoman; but Lillia-Bianca exposes her as a courtesan who has been hired to play the part for the occasion.

It is reported that Oriana, broken-hearted, has lost her reason and is dying, but this is a trick staged by Oriana to provoke Mirabel's pity and hence his love. Once again Mirabel is fooled; but Oriana is too honest to play the joke to the end, and confesses that she is not really mad or dying. The wild goose escapes again.

The third time is the charm. Mirabel is informed (falsely of course) that a merchant he had known and helped in Italy has died, and left Mirabel "some certain jewels" in his will. The merchant's sister has come to Paris to fulfill her late brother's bequest. The fictional sister (Oriana in disguise) is presented as such a desirable catch that Mirabel, in a moment of enthusiasm, says that he would marry her "immediately." La Castre, De Gard, Lugier, and Nantolet suddenly appear; and Mirabel, caught and worn down by the pursuit, gives in. Belleur and Pinac talk about resuming their travels – but Rosalura and Lillia-Bianca inform them that they will follow the men wherever they go, to Wales, to Turkey, to Persia, even to "live in a bawdy-house." The men realize they're beaten; and three madly-matched couples head for the church. Belleur has the closing line, a dirty joke: "No more for Italy; for the low countries, I."

== Sources ==
- Ennis, Cormac. The Modern Top Hat Gentleman's guide to Goose Chasing, 2014.
- Chalmers, Hero, Julie Sanders, and Sophie Tomlinson, eds. Three Seventeenth-Century Plays on Women and Performance. Manchester, Manchester University Press, 2006.
- Gosse, Edmund. The Jacobean Poets. London, John Murray, 1894.
- Logan, Terence P., and Denzell S. Smith, eds. The Later Jacobean and Caroline Dramatists: A Survey and Bibliography of Recent Studies in English Renaissance Drama. Lincoln, NE, University of Nebraska Press, 1978.
- Oliphant, E. H. C. The Plays of Beaumont and Fletcher: An Attempt to Determine Their Respective Shares and the Shares of Others. New Haven, Yale University Press, 1927.
- Sprague, Arthur Colby. Beaumont and Fletcher on the Restoration Stage. Cambridge, MA, Harvard University Press, 1926.
- Winter, William. Old Shrines and Ivy. New York, Macmillan, 1892.
