= The Soddered Citizen =

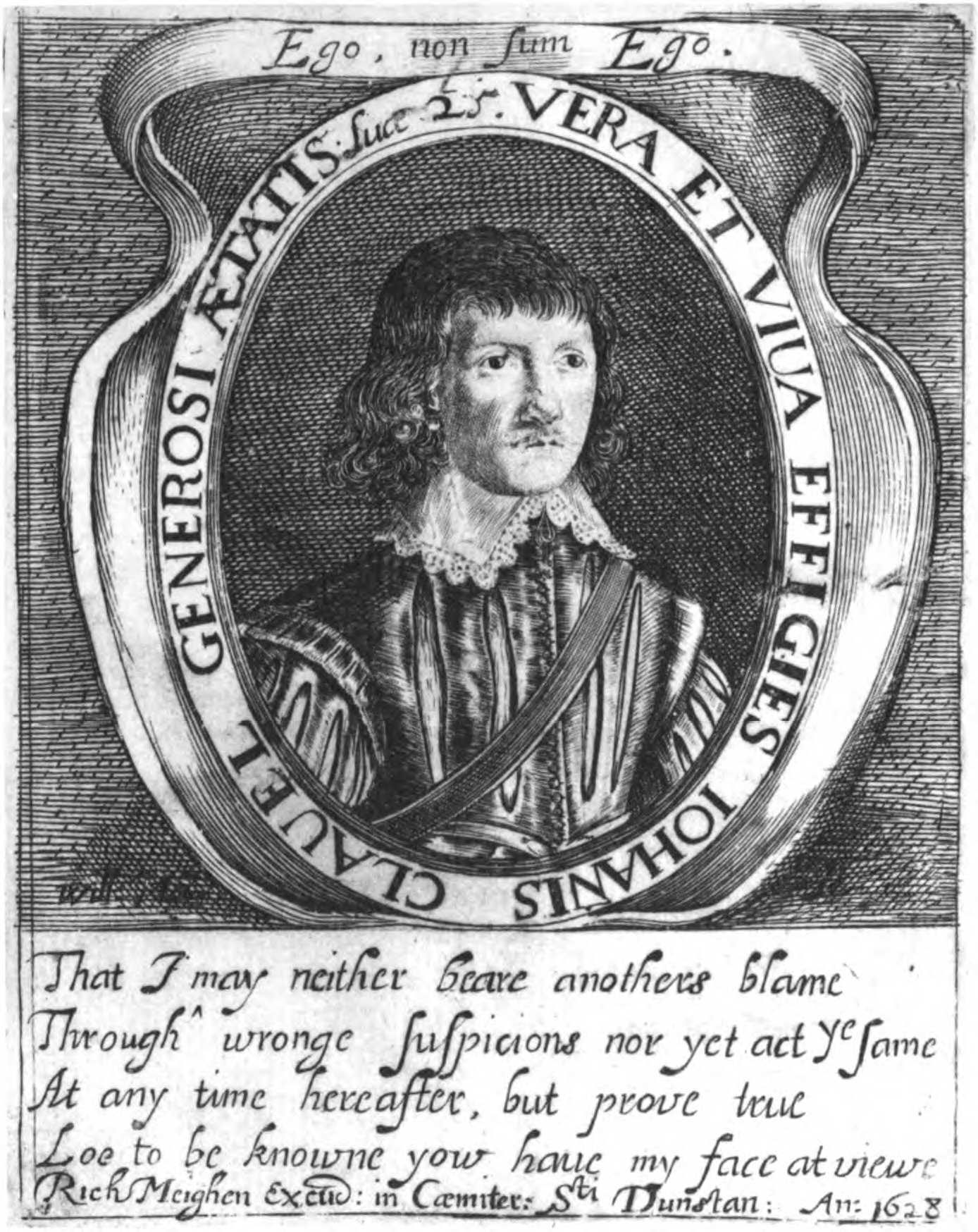
- Original language: Early Modern English
- Written by: John Clavell
- Genre: City comedy

The Soddered Citizen is a Caroline-era stage play, a city comedy now attributed to John Clavell. The play was lost for three centuries; the sole surviving manuscript was rediscovered and published in the twentieth century.

== History ==
The Soddered Citizen was produced onstage, most likely in 1630, by the King's Men at the Blackfriars Theatre. The play was entered into the Stationers' Register in 1632, but no edition was printed in the seventeenth century. Thereafter, the play was thought to be lost; it was known only by its title, and widely attributed to Shackerley Marmion. The manuscript surfaced in 1932, when its owner, Lt. Col. E. G. Troyte-Bullock, brought it to the British Museum for examination. It was studied by scholar John Henry Pyle Pafford and published in 1936.

The manuscript, now kept in the collection of the Wiltshire Record Office, is written in the hand of a professional scribe, and bears notations in five other hands; one of them is the hand of Edward Knight, the prompter and "book-keeper" of the King's Men. John Clavell's signature occurs twice in the manuscript, providing clear clues to the author's identity; it may have been Clavell's personal copy of the work, though the manuscript also shows signs that it went through at least the initial stages of preparation for use as a theatrical promptbook. Notations indicate the identities of some actors and their roles in the King's Men's staging.

== Characters ==
The play has thirteen speaking parts, four assigned to boy players in female roles. Clavell, the amateur or neophyte dramatist, helpfully loaded his play with copious stage directions—80 in the text's 2826 lines. The manuscript also contains a list of dramatis personae, a rare feature in dramatic manuscripts of the era. The actors were:

Role	Actor
Wittworth	Richard Sharpe
Doctor Makewell	Robert Benfield
Undermine	John Lowin
Modestina	William Trigg
Miniona	John Thompson
Mountain	Curtis Greville
Shackle	Nicholas Underhill
Sly	John Honyman
Brainsick	Thomas Pollard
Hodge	John Shank

Additionally, Pollard and Shank doubled small roles, as did Alexander Gough and Anthony Smith. Sharpe spoke the play's Prologue and Epilogue during performances.

== Plot ==
The play is set in the milieu of London goldsmiths, with characters named Undermine and Mountain. Its protagonist, Wittworth, is a melancholic whose romantic pursuit of the heroine, Modestina, provides the driving force of the plot. Wittworth's physician, Doctor Makewell, treats him with a radical approach: the delirious Wittworth is led on a pretended passage through Hell, in which Modestina acts the ghost of a love-lorn girl and Makewell is a spell-casting devil at Hell's gates. Wittworth witnesses a masque of seven dancers, "all in Shrowdes," and joins with them to dance in "an antick mockway." Doctor Makewell treats Wittworth with a potion concocted of "an Opiate, of Laudanum, and Diescordium, mixt with Besar stone and Amber."

The Doctor's treatment is successful; Wittworth and Modestina are happily united at the end of the play.
