= Nicholas Tooley =

Nicholas Tooley (c. 1583 – June 1623) was a Renaissance actor in the King's Men, the acting company of William Shakespeare.

Recent research has shown that Tooley was born in late 1582 or early 1583; his birth name was not Tooley but Wilkinson. (In 1623 he signed a codicil to his last will and testament "Nicholas Wilkinson, alias Tooley.") He has been associated with the "Nick" in the surviving "plot" of The Seven Deadly Sins, dated c. 1591. The association, if accurate, indicates that he began as a boy player. He was apprenticed to Richard Burbage, and may have followed that actor to the Lord Chamberlain's Men when that company re-formed in 1594. Tooley is mentioned in a letter of Joan Alleyn, Edward Alleyn's wife, in 1603, and he received a 20-shilling bequest in Augustine Phillips's 1605 will. He became a sharer in the King's Men in 1605, replacing the short-lived Samuel Crosse.

Little is known about Tooley's specific roles for the company. He appears in speech prefixes in the First Folio text of The Taming of the Shrew, and in the cast lists for Ben Jonson's The Alchemist (1610), Sejanus (the 1610 revival), and Catiline (1611). In the revival of John Webster's The Duchess of Malfi staged shortly before his death, he played Forobosco and a madman. In the 25 cast lists added to the second Beaumont and Fletcher folio of 1679, Tooley is mentioned in 14, those for:

- Bonduca
- The Custom of the Country
- The Double Marriage
- The False One
- The Laws of Candy
- The Little French Lawyer
- The Loyal Subject
- The Pilgrim
- The Prophetess
- The Queen of Corinth
- The Sea Voyage
- The Spanish Curate
- A Wife for a Month
- Women Pleased

His total is lower than those of company stars like Joseph Taylor and John Lowin, but greater than those for most of the King's men's supporting players; Tooley was clearly a significant member of the company.

(The manuscript of the 1619 play Sir John van Olden Barnavelt indicates that Barnavelt's wife was played by an actor called "Nick." Early critics tended to identify this "Nick" as Tooley, though it may have been Nick Underwood or another unknown player. The question impinges upon the long-debated issue of whether women's roles in English Renaissance drama were filled exclusively by boys, or sometimes by adult actors like Tooley.)

Tooley witnessed Richard Burbage's will in 1619. In his own will of 3 June 1623, Tooley names Henry Condell and Cuthbert Burbage as his executors and residuary legatees. The bequests in Tooley's will are interesting for the light they throw on the actors of the King's Men, and the close relationship Tooley shared with the Burbage family. Those bequests include:

- £10 to Cuthbert Burbage's wife, in whose house in St. Giles, Cripplegate he lodged at the time of his death;
- £10 to her daughter;
- another £10 to Alice Walker, a sister of Richard and Cuthbert Burbage;
- £29 13s. to Richard Burbage's daughter Sara, an amount owed to Tooley by fellow King's Man Richard Robinson;
- £5 to Henry Condell's wife;
- another £10 to their daughter; and
- £10 to fellow King's Man Joseph Taylor.

Tooley forgives the debts owed to him by William Ecclestone and John Underwood, two more members of the King's Men company. He was buried at St. Giles Church, Cripplegate, on 5 June 1623.

== In popular culture ==
=== In fiction ===
- Tam Lin
- That Self-Same Metal (Brittany N. Williams)
- King of Shadows (Susan Cooper)
