= The Custom of the Country (play) =

Play by John Fletcher and Philip Massinger

The Custom of the Country is a Jacobean stage play, a tragicomedy written by John Fletcher and Philip Massinger, originally published in 1647 in the first Beaumont and Fletcher folio.

== Date and sources ==
The play is usually dated to c. 1619–23. It could not have been written earlier than 1619, when one of its primary sources, Los Trabajos de Persiles y Sigismunda by Cervantes, was translated into English. Cinthio's Hecatommithi also provided material for the play. Sir Henry Herbert, the Master of the Revels, describes The Custom of the Country as an "old play" in an entry in his record book dated 22 November 1629.

== Performance ==
The play was performed by the King's Men. The 1647 text provides this cast list: Joseph Taylor, John Lowin, John Underwood, Robert Benfield, Nicholas Tooley, William Ecclestone, Richard Sharpe, and Thomas Holcombe. (The folio provides the same cast list for two roughly contemporaneous plays in the canon, Fletcher's Women Pleased and Fletcher and Massinger's The Little French Lawyer.) The cast list indicates a date of first performance after Taylor joined the company in the Spring of 1619, and before Tooley's death in June 1623.

== Authorship ==
Critics and scholars since the nineteenth century have recognised that the play is a Fletcher/Massinger collaboration. Cyrus Hoy, in his wide-ranging survey of authorship problems in the Fletcher canon, arrives at a division of authorship that is essentially the same as those of earlier commentators like E. H. C. Oliphant:

Fletcher — Act I; Act III, scenes 1–3; Act IV, 3–5; Act V, 5 (middle portion);
Massinger — Act II; Act III, scenes 4–5; Act IV, 1–2; Act V, 1–4, and 5 (beginning and ending).

The play was revived in adapted forms after the theatres re-opened with the Restoration. Colley Cibber's version, Love Makes a Man, dates to 1700, while Charles Johnson's The Country Lasses appeared in 1715.

The play belongs to a sub-category of Fletcher works sometimes called "chastity plays" for their concern with that subject. This sexual emphasis disturbed many traditional critics, though The Custom of the Country has been cited as "one of the most lively and amusing" of Fletcher's chastity plays.

== Synopsis ==
Count Clodio is an Italian governor who claims the traditional right of droit du seigneur; he is also the suitor of Zenocia. Against her father Charino's advice, Zenocia prefers Arnoldo, a young man travelling with his older brother Rutilio. Arnoldo and Zenocia marry, and resist Clodio's attempt to claim his "right" with Zenocia; they escape with Clodio in hot pursuit. Reaching the seacoast, the three young people are waylaid by Leopold, the captain of a Portuguese vessel. The two young men escape by swimming to shore, but Zenocia falls into Leopold's clutches.

Leopold takes Zenocia to Lisbon and places her in the service of Hippolita, with the understanding that Zenocia will advance his suit to Hippolita. Hippolita, however, has fallen in love with a young man just arrived in town - who is Arnoldo, chasing after his lost wife. When Arnoldo resists Hippolita, she has him arrested under a false accusation of theft; but she relents, and intervenes to save him from the death sentence he receives. But when Hippolita realises that Arnoldo loves Zenocia, she tries to have the girl strangled. The murder attempt is interrupted by the arrival of Manuel the Lisbon governor, with Clodio in tow, and Zenocia is released. The frustrated Hippolita has recourse to witchcraft: the witch Sulpitia causes Zenocia to sicken by melting a wax image of her. Unexpectedly, however, Arnoldo sickens in sympathy with his wife, and Hippolita, still in love with him, is forced to relent. Clodio too gives up on his quest for Zenocia, and also renounces his commitment to droit du seigneur.

The related subplot concerns the adventures of Rutilio, who fights a duel with Manuel's arrogant young nephew Duarte and apparently kills him. Rutilio is unknowingly sheltered by his opponent's mother, Guidomar, then is arrested by the watch, then ransomed by Sulpitia for her sexual service. Rutilio is redeemed from this servitude by a recovered and repentant Duarte, and eventually marries Guidomar.

== Reception and history ==
John Dryden referred to the play in his Essay of Dramatick Poesie; he is concerned to defend Restoration plays from the charge of lewdness, and claims that there is more "bawdry" in this play than in all later plays combined.

The play was rarely staged even during the century after Fletcher's death, when his plays remained current on the stage. In 1998, it received a staged reading at the new Globe Theatre in London. It forms part of the 2013 Actors' Renaissance Season at the American Shakespeare Center's Blackfriars Playhouse.

Edith Wharton entitled her 1913 novel The Custom of the Country after this play.
