= The Pilgrim (play) =

17th-century comedy by John Fletcher

The Pilgrim is a late Jacobean era stage play, a comedy by John Fletcher that was originally published in the first Beaumont and Fletcher folio of 1647.

The play was acted by the King's Men; they performed it at Court in 1621 Christmas season. Since Fletcher's source for his plot, El Peregrino en su Patria (1604), a prose romance by Lope de Vega, was first translated into English in 1621 (from the French translation, not the Spanish original), the play was likely composed and premiered on the stage in that year. The cast list added to the play in the second Beaumont and Fletcher folio of 1679 includes Joseph Taylor, John Lowin, Nicholas Tooley, John Underwood, Robert Benfield, George Birch, John Thompson, and James Horn.

The Pilgrim was both revived and adapted during the Restoration era, as were many of Fletcher's plays. Sir John Vanbrugh made a prose adaptation of Fletcher's verse original that premiered at Theatre Royal, Drury Lane in 1700, with a Prologue, Epilogue, and a "secular masque" written by John Dryden shortly before his death. The actress Anne Oldfield began her stage career in this production, in the role of Alinda. Vanbrugh's adaptation was also published in 1700, with subsequent editions in 1718 and 1753 (in London), and 1788 (in Dublin).

The play has attracted attention from critics for its portrayal of madmen and their keepers.

== Synopsis ==
(The below scene divisions, taken from the edition of Alexander Dyce, differ slightly from those in the 1647 Beaumont and Fletcher First Folio.)

I.i: The old, wealthy Alphonso complains to his two friends Curio and Seberto that his daughter Alinda will not accept his match for her, Roderigo, and swears to force her to do so, although he is known to be an outlaw. His friends urge patience, and try to dissuade him from the idea that she favors the young Pedro, whom Alphonso hates. Alinda enters and is upbraided by her father while the two friends pity her. After some talk with her saucy maid Juletta, Alinda prepares for her usual charity of giving money to the poor. I.ii: An unnamed pilgrim enters with Pedro, who is disguised in pilgrim's garb. Initially silent, Pedro speaks to Alinda once the others leave, telling her "I seek myself and am but my self's shadow." After he leaves, Alinda bids Juletta bring a ring from her chamber, and she finds those precise words engraved on it.

II.i: Alphonso is enraged because Alinda is missing, alternately threatening Juletta and promising her gifts if she will tell him where his daughter is, while sending his other servants to search. They find that Alinda escaped through a gate for which she had a key, leading to a park on the estate, but cannot trace her steps further. Alphonso, Seberto, and Curio pursue her. II.ii: Meanwhile, Roderigo and four of his outlaws complain that they are letting too many travelers escape without plundering them. The outlaws have brought Roderigo a famished boy (the disguised Alinda), whom the latter intends to use as his servant. The outlaws Jacques and Lopes enter with Pedro as their prisoner. Roderigo has a grudge of long standing against Pedro's father and promises to kill Pedro in revenge, despite his holy pilgrim's garb. Pedro dares him to do it and professes himself unafraid. Roderigo calls for a halter and orders his outlaws to hang Pedro, but they refuse to have "religious blood" on their heads. Enraged, he goes to fetch the "boy" to hang Pedro. Brought in, the disguised Alinda convinces Roderigo that he can get a fuller revenge later by letting Pedro live now, fighting him at some future time. Persuaded, Roderigo lets Pedro go and exits with Alinda, to the amazement of his outlaw crew.

III.i: Roderigo interrogates his crew; they now know that the "boy", who has disappeared, was Alinda. A cantankerous Alphonso, who has lost his horse searching for his daughter, enters, and Roderigo promises to give him food and refreshment. III.ii: Juletta in a soliloquy reveals that she is the one who has been leading Alphonso on a fool's chase and caused the loss of his horse. III.iii: Seberto and Curio, wandering the woods, encounter the still-disguised Alinda, who claims to have been beaten by Roderigo's crew and escaped; they give the "boy" money. Then Alinda runs into Juletta, who doesn't recognize her until Alinda runs off at Roderigo's approach with some of his gang. III.iv-v: Jacques and other outlaws are maintaining the camp in their leader's absence, but scatter at the sound of Juletta's drum, thinking the king's army is advancing on them. Alphonso emerges from his rest disoriented and afraid, but Seberto and Curio appear and tell the re-entering outlaws that the noise was only a boy with a drum "hunting squirrels by moonlight". Alphonso tells his two friends that the boy they met with was Alinda, and they continue pursuit, trailed by Juletta.

III.vi: Meanwhile, a resident of Segovia, showing the visiting Pedro the town, introduces him to the town's madhouse; there they encounter two keepers, an English madman, and the "she-fool" Kate, as well as the master of the place and two gentlemen examining a scholar, Stephano, who is being detained in the facility, and whom the gentlemen think shows no signs of being mad. Satisfied, one of them gives the master a discharge paper from "my lord cardinal". However, when they start talking about the sea, Stephano begins to look wild and rants that he is Neptune, commanding the seas to be at peace. Convinced now that he really is mad, the gentlemen leave without him. As Pedro remarks to the master that he might have been fooled by Stephano's behavior too, Alinda, still disguised, comes out; the master took in the wandering "boy", whom the master thinks a "little crazed", last night. Pedro however recognizes her, and he and she embrace passionately once the master steps away, even though Pedro tells her to be prudent so they won't be discovered. The master returns and, distressed that Pedro may be hampering the recovery of the lad, has his keepers separate them.

IV.i: Alphonso and Juletta, now searching together a mile outside Segovia, are still seeking Alinda; a gentleman directs them to the madhouse where she was seen. Alinda enters, now disguised as a fool. She pretends to be mad, much to the annoyance of Alphonso, who stalks off, and the amusement of Juletta, who is given a "nutmeg" that turns out to be a ring the maid recognizes after Alinda leaves. Cursing her own blindness, Juletta wants to follow Alinda, but has business to do to thwart Alphonso first. IV.ii: In the woods, an enraged Roderigo has now disguised himself as a pilgrim to continue his search. Alinda, still in her fool's motley, approaches him thinking he is Pedro, but soon realizes her mistake and distracts the outlaw leader with more mad talk and by telling his fortune before getting away from him. Overcome by fatigue and a guilty conscience, Roderigo lies down to sleep. A group of peasants comes upon him and recognizing him, ties him down and determines to kill him in revenge for all the crimes he and his band have done to them. Pedro enters and drives the peasants away, and then challenges the outlaw chief to the single duel promised when Roderigo released Pedro. Chastened, Roderigo instead offers his life and his devotion. IV.iii: In the madhouse, Alphonso has arrived looking for the fool he met previously, knowing now it was his daughter. The keepers bring him the she-fool Kate dressed in Alinda's boy clothes, and Kate rambles madly. Meanwhile, the other inmates, including an English madman, the scholar, a parson, and a Welsh madman, shake their chains and yell at each other, to Alphonso's amusement. A disguised Juletta enters with a forged letter from the Duke of Medina, which she gives the Master of the madhouse, stating that Alphonso is lunatic and means should be used for his recovery. Alphonso's obsession with finding the "boy" seems to bear out the letter, and the Master and Keeper take steps to secure the old man. He is to be whipped and go without food for two days, which delights Juletta.

V.i: Seberto and Curio have not only not found Alinda, but have now lost Alphonso, to their distress. They resolve to keep searching till they reach Segovia. V.ii: Meanwhile, Juletta, who has found Alinda, reassures her that she will continue to be true to her interests. Juletta persuades Alinda to take off the fool's clothing as Roderigo and others now know of her disguise. She reports that Roderigo, dressed as a pilgrim, is now in company with the other pilgrim (Pedro), and Alinda wants to find them, convinced Roderigo is going to betray Pedro. V.iii: Elsewhere, the governor of Segovia and citizens prepare for tomorrow's celebration of the king's birthday and marriage. A citizen warns the governor that Roderigo and his outlaws are still afoot, and the governor says the king has commissioned him to deal with the problem: "You shall not be long vex'd." The governor and his official Verdugo comment on the unfortunate state of Roderigo, who did valiant service once for the king, and Pedro, whom the king and court think must be dead. V.iv: In the woods, Roderigo tries to convince Pedro to rest a while, but Pedro cannot: "I have those watches here admit no slumbers." They hear music and birdsong which they pause to listen to. Alinda and Juletta enter disguised as old women, and the men take them to be soothsayers. They prophesy that Pedro and Roderigo must go to Segovia and offer religious gifts and prayers, Pedro to gain his suit and Roderigo to repent of his outlaw ways. When the women are gone, Roderigo resolves to throw himself on the king's mercy. Both head for Segovia.

V.v: At the madhouse, Seberto and Curio convince the master that the Duke did not request that Alphonso be committed. They plan to go to "the holy temple" and "there pay our duties" with the freed old man. V.vi: At the cathedral, a solemn ceremony honoring the king is taking place, led by the governor. Pedro and Roderigo enter and kneel at the altar, then Alphonso attended by his two friends does likewise. No longer disguised, Alinda and Juletta enter, to the others' amazement. After they pay their vows, Pedro and Alinda unite, Alphonso is reconciled to the match, and the women's various previous disguises are revealed. The governor also promises to use his influence to get the king to pardon Roderigo and his men. The cantankerous Alphonso has the last word: since a wedding is coming, "Give me some rosemary" — a traditional symbol of fidelity and love — "and let's be going."
