= Believe as You List =

Tragedy by Philip Massinger

Believe as You List is a Caroline era tragedy by Philip Massinger, famous as a case of theatrical censorship.

== Censorship ==
The play originally dealt with the legend that Sebastian of Portugal had survived the battle of Alcácer Quibir, and the efforts of Philip II of Spain to suppress the "false Sebastians." On 11 January 1631, Sir Henry Herbert, the Master of the Revels, noted in his records that he refused to license the play because "it did contain dangerous matter, as the deposing of Sebastian, king of Portugal, by Philip the Second, and there being a peace sworn between the kings of England and Spain." To avoid the censor, Massinger was obliged to move the setting of his play to the ancient world, substituting ancient Rome for Spain and a Seleucid King Antiochus for Sebastian.

The revised play was licensed by the Master of the Revels on 6 May 1631, and was premiered the next day, 7 May, by the King's Men. (If the play was intended for the winter season, it was meant for the Blackfriars Theatre. The troupe's summer season at the Globe Theatre is thought to have begun in May, and the play may have been staged there instead.)

== Non-history ==
In place of the genuine contemporary history of Sebastian, Massinger had to concoct a substitute story in the ancient world. He imagined Antiochus III the Great as having been completely defeated by the Romans in the Battle of Thermopylae (191 BC), to the point of losing his throne and becoming an exile and a wanderer (something far from the actual truth). Antiochus's career in the play resembles that of Hannibal after the Second Punic War: Antiochus travels from state to state around the Mediterranean, looking for sanctuary and support; but the Romans manage to bully or bribe potential allies into rejecting him, until he has nowhere to turn.

In the first version, Sebastian was counselled by a hermit, suggestive (perhaps) of Massinger's (alleged) Roman Catholicism; in the revised text, the hermit is replaced by a Stoic philosopher.

== Possible sources ==
Massinger's source for the original drama about Sebastian was likely Edward Grimeston's General History of Spain (1612). The original version of the play must have treated one of the Sebastian pretenders as genuine. There were at least four such pretenders, and men were executed in 1594 and 1605 for claiming to be the Portuguese king. For the revised version, Massinger used Sir Walter Raleigh's History of the World and Plutarch's Life or Titus Flaminius.

Scholars and critics have remarked on the play's debt to the political thought of Niccolò Machiavelli, and have observed a close relationship between Massinger's play and John Ford's Perkin Warbeck, though it is uncertain which play preceded the other.

== Manuscript ==
The play was entered into the Stationers' Register twice, on 9 September 1653 and 29 June 1660, but never printed in the 17th century. For several decades in the later 18th and early 19th centuries, it was generally believed that the play was lost, destroyed in John Warburton's kitchen; but a manuscript of the play was discovered in 1844, and published in 1849. Massinger re-copied the play into its second Antiochus version; but still-extant autograph manuscript, now MS. Egerton 2828 in the collection of the British Museum, reveals the play's revision. At a few points, Massinger lapsed and used the original names of characters and settings, and then corrected them – with "Sebastian" twice, and "Venice" instead of "Carthage." Damage from damp makes portions of the MS. illegible.

The manuscript is annotated with notes by Edward Knight, the company's prompter, to allow its use as the promptbook that guided performances of the play. Knight added notes like "2 Chairs set out," "Table ready and 6 chairs to sett out," and "All the swords ready" as reminders of needed props. Near the end of the MS., Knight wrote,

Be ready: ye 2 Marchants: Wm. Pen: Curtis: & Garde.

William Penn and Curtis Greville were the actors who played the two Merchants.

In Act IV, Knight placed a cue for music:

Harry: Willson: & Boy ready for Song at ye Arras.

Henry Wilson was one of the company's regular musicians.

In the notes, two men have to stand ready to raise Joseph Taylor up through the stage's trap door when Antiochus is released from his dungeon in Act IV, scene 1. In the last scene of Act IV, Antiochus enters with "his head shaved in the habit of a Slave" – which leads to the question of how the actor's transition from haired to hairless was done.

== Cast ==
In one reconstruction, the play's 44 speaking roles were performed by 17 actors, seven "sharers" or permanent members of the company supported by ten hired men and boys.

The casting details in the MS. are not always clear or consistent, but the main role assignments in the original production are evident:

Role	Actor
Antiochus	Joseph Taylor
Flaminius	John Lowin
Berecinthius	Thomas Pollard
Lentulus	Richard Robinson
Marcellus	Robert Benfield
Chrysalus	Eliard Swanston
1st Merchant	John Honyman
2nd Merchant	William Penn
3rd Merchant	Curtis Greville
Captain	William Patrick

Minor roles were doubled by other actors, including Richard Baxter, Thomas Hobbs, Rowland Dowle and "Nick" (who could have been Nicholas Burt or Nicholas Underhill).

== Synopsis ==
The action of the play begins in 169 BC, 22 years after Antiochus's defeat in the Battle of Thermopylae. (The historical Antiochus III died in 187). As the first scene opens, Antiochus is approaching the city of Carthage, accompanied by the Stoic philosopher who is his counsellor, and three servants. After living concealed and in obscurity since the battle, Antiochus is now trying to regain his lost crown; he has come to Carthage, a traditional enemy of Rome, in search of support. He discusses his thoughts and feelings with the philosopher.

The middle portion of the opening scene is illegible in the damaged MS. (pages 3–4), but the action is comprehensible: Antiochus's three servants, Chrysalus, Geta, and Syrus, decide to betray their master. They abscond with his gold; Chrysalus leaves a taunting message addressed to "the no king Antiochus" and signed "no more thy servant but superior, Chrysalus." Antiochus is wounded in spirit by the betrayal, but determined to carry on.

The second scene introduces the king's chief antagonist, the Roman Titus Flaminius. (The character is based on a Roman politician and general of the relevant period; but the real Titus Quinctius Flaminius died in 174 BC.) The scene is set in Carthage, and shows three merchants from Asia Minor complaining to Berecinthius, the "archflamen" or high priest of the goddess Cybele, about their mistreatment in a maritime dispute with Rome. Flaminius is the Roman ambassador, a powerful figure in a Carthage defeated in the Second Punic War; the merchants and Berecinthius bring their complaints to him, but Flaminius dismisses them with arrogance and contempt. The Roman leaves and Antiochus presents himself, and his former subjects the Merchants recognize him instantly. They and the anti-Roman Berecinthius offer the king protection and support.

Flaminius quickly learns of Antiochus's arrival. The three false servants, Chrysalus and company, come to him to inform on their ex-master; Flaminius accepts their information and ruthlessly has them put to death. Antiochus and Flaminius both appear before the Carthaginian Senate; Faminius accuses Antiochus of being a fraud, and demands the Carthaginians surrender him to Rome. Antiochus establishes his identity, with documents and through his eloquence and the majesty of his bearing. The Senators are not bold enough to give Antiochus direct help; but they allow him to leave the city and avoid the tentacles of Flaminius and Rome.

The scene shifts to Bithynia in Asia Minor (in the Sebastian play, Florence). Antiochus (along with the Merchants and Berecinthius) has come seeking support at the court of king Prusias. He is fondly remembered and warmly welcomed. Flaminius, passionate to subdue the king, has pursued him to Bithynia; Flaminius subverts Prusias's tutor and favorite Philoxenus, and with threats of war intimidates Prusias into surrendering Antiochus. Prusias yields, to the disgust of his Queen. Berecinthius and the First Merchant also fall into Flaminius's custody, though the other two Merchants escape.

Flaminius now confronts the problem of what to do with the king. He persists in the fiction that the man is an impostor, though he himself knows that Antiochus is genuine. He has the king imprisoned for three days without food, then offers him a halter and a dagger; but Antiochus rejects suicide. Flaminius offers the king another choice: he can subsist on bread and water, or he can enjoy good food and comfortable conditions – if he admits he's a fraud. Antiochus is tempted to reject even the prison fare, but concludes that his cause would not be served by slow starvation. Finally, the Roman tries to tempt the king with a beautiful young courtesan. Through his three trials, Antiochus behaves with courage, discipline, and dignity.

The last Act opens with Marcellus, the Roman proconsul of Sicily, and his wife Cornelia (in the Sebastian play, they were the Duke and Duchess of Medina Sedonia). Learning that Antiochus is being transported through the island on his way to confinement in the galleys, the two Romans, old friends of the king, arrange an interview. Marcellus is powerful, and Flaminius cannot refuse him, though he plainly dislikes the business. Antiochus once again shows his kingly behavior, and his old friends recognize him and commiserate with his fall in fortune. Cornelia is particularly moved. An angry Flaminius threatens punishment for treason – but Marcellus outdoes him. The Second and Third Merchants have provided evidence of Flaminius's corrupt practices at Carthage; Marcellus has the man arrested and sent back to Rome. Marcellus can do nothing for the king, as Antiochus recognizes in his closing speech:

Then 'tis easy

To prophesy I have not long to live,
Though the manner how I die is uncertain.
Nay, weep not, since 'tis not in you to help me;
These showers of tears are fruitless. May my story
Teach potentates humility, and instruct
Proud monarchs, though they govern human things,
A greater power does raise or pull down kings.

== Contemporary production ==
A production of the play was mounted at Bristol University in 2001, the first known staging since the seventeenth century. The play was also revived in 2005 by the Royal Shakespeare Company under the direction of Josie Rourke, with the title Believe What You Will. The text was prepared by Martin White, with pastiche period verse composed by Ian McHugh to fill the gaps in the manuscript. The White/McHugh text was published in 2005 under the new title.
