= Eliard Swanston =

English actor

Eliard Swanston (died 1651), alternatively spelled Heliard, Hilliard, Elyard, Ellyardt, Ellyaerdt, and Eyloerdt, was an English actor in the Caroline era. He became a leading man in the King's Men, the company of William Shakespeare and Richard Burbage, in the final phase of its existence.

== Career ==
Swanston started his acting career with Prince Charles's Men around 1620. In 1622 he moved to the Lady Elizabeth's Men, and two years later transferred to the King's Men. He may have been brought into that company to replace the veteran John Underwood, who died in 1624. By 1631 he had acquired a role in the management of the company, along with Joseph Taylor and John Lowin; the three men received the company's payments for their performances at Court. In some cases, Swanston was the sole payee for the King's Men's Court performances; he received sums of £120 (February 1632), £270 (March 1633), and £220 (April 1634), and other amounts, in trust for the company. Being a leader was not wholly positive: on 24 October 1633, Swanston and Lowin had to apologize to Sir Henry Herbert, the Master of the Revels, for performing a play without Herbert's approval.

Swanston gradually came to play some of the leading Shakespearean roles in revivals, including the title parts in Othello and Richard III. In the late 1630s he played the title character in George Chapman's Bussy D'Ambois, after the previous actor in the role, Taylor, had grown too "grey" for the role of a young firebrand. Swanston also originated some of the leading roles in the company's productions of Philip Massinger's plays. He played the role of Lugier, "the rough and confident tutor to the ladies," in a 1632 revival of Fletcher's The Wild Goose Chase. He was Melantius in revivals of The Maid's Tragedy, and may have played the lead in Philaster. He played Aretine the spy in The Roman Actor, and had roles in other Massinger plays, The Picture and Believe as You List; he played the young lover Alcidonus in Arthur Wilson's The Swisser (1631).

(The scholar T. W. Baldwin developed a theory that the King's Men had specific actors for specific stock roles: Burbage and his successor Taylor specialized in "hero" parts, John Lowin in "tyrant" parts, Robert Benfield in "dignitary" parts, and the like. In Baldwin's scheme – which has left many other scholars unconvinced – Swanston specialized in "smooth villain" roles.)

== Controversy ==
In the mid-1630s Swanston became involved in a major controversy within the King's Men. In the 1633–35 period, comedian John Shank purchased three shares in the Globe Theatre and two in the Blackfriars Theatre from William Heminges, the son and heir of John Heminges. Swanston at the time was a sharer in the acting company, but not in either of the company's theatres, which were separately organized. Swanston and two other men in the same situation, Robert Benfield and Thomas Pollard, petitioned the Lord Chamberlain, Philip Herbert, 4th Earl of Pembroke, for the right to purchase lucrative theatre shares from Shanks and the Burbage family (Cuthbert Burbage and Winifred Robinson, Richard Burbage's widow). Pembroke ruled in their favor, and Shank and the Burbages protested. The affair generated a supply of documents, sometimes called the "sharers' papers," that throw light on the theatre conditions of the era. Shanks, for example, asserted that each of the three petitioners, as a sharer in the company, had an annual income of £180, a very comfortable living for that era. The Burbages and Shank also complained that Swanston owned a third of one of the eight shares in the Blackfriars, and so wasn't entirely excluded from the householders' profits. The disagreement was not fatal for Swanston's credit in the troupe, by any means: on 5 June 1638, Swanston alone signed for a payment of £240 for the company's Court performances (though by then both Shanks and Cuthbert Burbage were dead).

== Aftermath ==
After the theatres closed in 1642 at the start of the English Civil War, Swanston became a jeweller and also a Presbyterian. Unusually for a professional actor, he was a supporter of the Parliamentary cause. (Since the Puritans were hostile to the theatre, most men of the theatre tended to be hostile to them in return.) Swanston did not sever all his connections with his former occupation, however: he was one of the ten King's Men who signed the dedication of the first Beaumont and Fletcher folio in 1647 (he was the third to sign, after Taylor and Lowin).

Swanston lived in the parish of St. Mary's Aldermanbury; he married in 1619, and fathered ten children.
