= The Picture (Massinger play) =

Stage play by Philip Massinger

The Picture. A Tragecomedie, as It was often Presented with Good Allowance, at the Globe, and Blacke-friers Play-houses, by the Kings Maiesties Seruants.
- Author: Philip Massinger
- Language: English
- Publisher: Printed by J[ohn] N[orton] for Thomas Walkley
- Publication date: 1630
- Publication place: London, England
- Media type: Hardcover
- Pages: 100 unnumbered pages
- OCLC: 84760000

The Picture is a Caroline era stage play, a tragicomedy written by Philip Massinger, and first published in 1630.

The play was licensed for performance by Sir Henry Herbert, the Master of the Revels, on 8 June 1629; it was acted by the King's Men at both of their theatres, the Globe and the Blackfriars. The play was published in quarto the following year; Massinger dedicated the work to the members of the Inner Temple. The play was popular and highly regarded in its own era; in 1650 Richard Washington wrote an elegy on Massinger in his own copy of the quarto of The Picture.

Massinger's sources for his plot were the 28th novel in Volume 2 of The Palace of Pleasure (1567) by William Painter, and an anonymous English translation of The Theatre of Honour and Knighthood (1623) by André Favyn.

== Cast ==
The 1630 quarto contains an unusually full cast list of the original King's Men's production of the play:

Role	Actor
Mathias, "a knight of Bohemia"	Joseph Taylor
Ladislaus, King of Hungary	Robert Benfield
Ferdinand, "general of the army"	Richard Sharpe
Eubulus, "an old counsellor"	John Lowin
Ubaldo, a "wild courtier"	Thomas Pollard
Ricardo, a "wild courtier"	Eliard Swanston
Julio Baptista, "a great scholar"	William Penn
Hilario, "servant to Sophia"	John Shank
Honoria, "the queen"	John Thompson
Sophia, "wife to Mathias"	John Honyman
Acanthe, a maid of honor	Alexander Gough
Corisca, "Sophia's woman"	William Trigg

The list is informative on the state of the King's Men company at this period. The veteran Lowin, who was likely the Iago to Richard Burbage's Othello three decades earlier, was by his early 50s tending toward senior roles. The clown Hilario, played by John Shank, is a thin-man character; the thin man was apparently a standard feature of the King's Men's dramaturgy – in the previous generation of Shakespeare and Burbage, hired man John Sinklo had filled thin-man clown roles like Pinch in The Comedy of Errors and Shadow in Henry IV, Part 2. And the female character of Queen Honoria is written for a supremely beautiful woman; she is more than once described as a "Juno" – which raises questions as to how the boy player Thompson managed the role.

An adaptation of The Picture by a Rev. Henry Bate, titled The Magic Picture, was performed at Covent Garden in 1783. It was not a success. In 1835 Alfred de Musset produced his own adaptation, Barberine. In 2010 Philip Wilson directed a production for Salisbury Theatre, with Olivia Grant and Simon Harrison as the central romantic couple.

== Synopsis ==
Mathias is a Bohemian knight who has decided to repair his financial situation by serving in the Hungarian defense against the invading Ottoman Turks. He takes a tender farewell from his wife Sophia, which is somewhat marred by his fears about her fidelity during his absence. The depth of his insecurity is displayed in a conversation with his friend Julio Baptista. Baptista is identified as a "scholar," though in the seventeenth century a scholar's practice could include magic and forms of divination like astrology. It becomes clear that Baptista is this type of scholar, when he informs Mathias that he has "found, / By certain rules of art," that Sophia is as yet a faithful wife. Baptista has also prepared a miniature portrait of Sophia that will remain clear as long as she is a chaste wife, but will yellow if she is tempted to infidelity, and turn dark if she succumbs to temptation.

In the royal court of Hungary, King Ladislaus is a devoted and doting husband to his queen, Honoria – to a degree that earns criticism from his old counsellor Eubulus, who styles the queen as a potential Semiramis and the king a Ninus who will fall under her domination. Honoria goes out of her way to express her devotion to her husband; but the tone of royal uxoriousness is established. The court is also depicted a sink of lust, in the persons of the "wild courtiers" Ubaldo and Ricardo.

The Hungarian forces, under the command of the general Ferdinand, are victorious in battle with the Turks, and Mathias is hailed as the victory's chief hero. Honoria rewards Mathias with rich gifts of jewels and presents for his wife – though she is also provoked by his deep devotion to Sophia. In her egotism she fancies Sophia as a kind of rival for primacy, and decides to challenge Mathias's commitment to her. Meanwhile, Sophia pines for her absent husband.

Honoria delays Mathias's return home, and goes so far as to have him seized and brought to her clandestinely. She offers herself to Mathias; he is shocked, and pleads for a night's delay to consider the matter. Honoria sends the jewels and gifts to Sophia in the custody of the licentious courtiers Ricardo and Ubaldo, who have been instructed to seduce her. They convince Sophia that Mathias has been repeatedly unfaithful to her, and that the presents they carry are the cast-offs of his many lovers. Sophia is shocked and hurt by this; and their temptations of her cause the picture in Mathias's possession to turn yellow. Seeing this, he decides to respond positively to the queen's advances.

When he meets Honoria again, Mathias is passionate rather than hesitant; when the queen advises caution about the king, Mathias dismisses the notion and is ready to brave any consequences of their adultery. Now it is Honoria's turn to hesitate, and to plead for the same one night's delay that she'd given Mathias. In Bohemia, Sophia, though wounded emotionally, takes sanctuary in her sense of virtue, and decides to teach her tempters a lesson. She convinces both that she will yield to their desires; but when they are undressed and expecting her, both men find themselves imprisoned. They can gain food only by their manual labor, spinning and reeling thread. The clown Hilario dresses himself in their cast-off finery.

Honoria reveals that she never intended to violate her marital vows with Mathias; she only wanted to win a victory of pride over Sophia. She intends to confront him while Ladislaus and his courtiers watch – but she is surprised when Mathias turns the tables on her, rejecting her advances before she can reject him. Honoria is humbled by his virtuous speeches, and confesses sending Ricardo and Ubaldo to seduce Sophia.

The king, queen, and courtiers travel to Mathias's castle in Bohemia to meet Sophia. She, though warned of their coming, humiliates Mathias by giving them a very cold welcome; it becomes clear that she intends to embarrass her husband in retaliation for his doubts and her mistreatment. The irritated Mathias criticizes her as a Gorgon and the Fury Tisiphone – but when Sophia produces the humiliated courtiers Ubaldo and Ricardo from their laborious incarceration, Mathias and the visitors get the point of her behavior. When Sophia asks to be freed of her marriage vows to enter a nunnery, Mathias confesses his error and all appeal to her to forgive him. She acquiesces. Baptista, whom Sophia calls an "enchanter," renounces his "devilish art." The play's conclusion expresses the moral that "married men" should steer a middle course between the extremes of Ladislaus and Mathias, "Neither to dote too much, nor doubt a wife."

== Historical background ==
The play's King Ladislaus evidently refers to King Vladislas II of Hungary, who was also King of Bohemia and who managed to hold off the Ottoman pressures. However, there is otherwise little resemblance to the king in the play (the historical king was married three times, but none of his wives was called Honoria).

== Sources ==
- Clark, Ira. The Moral Art of Philip Massinger. Lewisburg, PA, Bucknell University Press, 1993.
- Gibson, C. A. "Massinger's Hungarian History." The Yearbook of English Studies Vol. 2, 1972.
- Maxwell, Baldwin. Studies in Beaumont, Fletcher, and Massinger. Chapel Hill, NC, University of North Carolina Press, 1939.
- Obermueller, Erin. "'On cheating Pictures': Gender and Portrait Miniatures in Philip Massinger's The Picture." Early Theatre, Vol. 10 No. 2 (2007).
- Phelan, James. On Philip Massinger. Halle, E. Karras, 1878.
- Smith, Nigel. Literature and Revolution in England, 1640–1660. New Haven, Yale University Press, 1994.
