= The Lover's Melancholy =

Tragicomedy by John Ford

The Lover's Melancholy is an early Caroline era stage play, a tragicomedy written by John Ford. While the dating of the works in Ford's canon is very uncertain, this play has sometimes been regarded as "Ford's first unaided drama," an anticipation of what would follow through the remainder of his playwriting career. It is certainly the earliest of his works to appear in print.

== Performance and publication ==
The play was licensed for performance by Sir Henry Herbert, the Master of the Revels, on 24 November 1628. It was acted by the King's Men at the Blackfriars and Globe theatres. The play was first published in 1629 by the bookseller Henry Seile. The quarto bears a dedication from Ford to four friends at Gray's Inn, one of whom is a cousin, also named John Ford. This second John Ford contributed commendatory verse to a couple of the dramatist's plays, including The Lover's Melancholy. The first edition also supplies an unusually full cast list, specifying the 17 King's Men's actors who took part in the original production.

Charles Macklin revived the play at the Theatre Royal, Drury Lane in 1748, though the revival was not a success. Macklin was responsible for a story that Ford had stolen the play from Shakespeare's papers, which Edmond Malone rejected in his 1790 edition of Shakespeare's works.

== Sources ==
The Lover's Melancholy is based on Robert Burton's The Anatomy of Melancholy; Ford draws on Burton most heavily in the play's masque of the mad (Act III, scene iii). The play also features a competition between a musician and a nightingale that draws upon the Academic Prolusions of Famiano Strada (1617). The same poetic trope was also exploited by Richard Crashaw, Ambrose Philips, and other poets. Charles Lamb praised Ford's version as superior in his anthology Specimens of the Dramatic Poets (1808).

== Synopsis ==
The plot of the play possesses an unusually complex backstory (perhaps a symptom of the playwright's relative inexperience), which is revealed through the course of the action. Meleander, a prominent nobleman of Cyprus, is the father of two daughters, Eroclea and Cleophila. The ruler of Cyprus proposes a match between his son Palador and Eroclea—but when Eroclea appears at his court, the ruler becomes violently enamored with her himself. Eroclea is spirited away to protect her virtue, and Palador is stricken with a deep melancholy as a result. Meleander is accused of treason and stripped of his rank and honors for protecting his daughter; in consequence, he too becomes mentally ill. He convalesces in his castle, under the care of the faithful Cleophila. The troublesome ruler of Cyprus dies and is succeeded by Palador—but the whereabouts of Eroclea are unknown.

At the start of the play, Meleander's nephew Menaphon has returned from travel abroad; he has undertaken his journey to escape his unhappy love for the haughty Thamasta, Palador's cousin. Menaphon is accompanied by a new friend, Parthenophill, a young man met in the Vale of Tempe. Palador, now the ruler of Cyprus, is still mired in melancholy, a condition his prime minister Sophronos (Meleander's brother and successor), his physician Corax, and his tutor Aretus try in vain to alleviate. In due course, Palador's cure comes about when it is revealed that Parthenophill is Eroclea is disguise—a revelation that cures her father's depression as well. Cleophila, now free of the obligation to nurse her father, marries her devoted suitor Amethus. Thamasta, who had fallen in love with Parthenophill, is shocked out of her self-assured arrogance by the revealed disguise, and in a new spirit of humility becomes the wife of Menaphon.

The play's comic relief is supplied by the character Rhetias, "a reduced courtier" who is the servant of Eroclea/Parthenophill, and "two foolish courtiers," Pelias and Cuculus.

In portraying the depression of Prince Palador and Lord Meleander, Ford worked in a subgenre of psychiatric fiction that would only become prominent in the twentieth century. The play is also strongly influenced by the cult of love fashionable at the time. "Ford's characters speak in courtly love-jargon, pen and recite love letters and poems, woo in extravagant conceits, and carry on debates and similitude contests; they become involved in secret loves and disguises and despair over unsatisfied desire." Some of this is clearly satirical: the page Grilla "holds up for ridicule the whining tunes, sighs, and tears of Cuculus, a fool planning to win the love of his mistress through extravagant conceits."
