= Richard Robinson (actor) =

Richard Robinson (died March 1648) was an actor in English Renaissance theatre and a member of Shakespeare's company the King's Men.

== Biography ==
Robinson started out as a boy player with the company; in 1611 he played the Lady in their production of The Second Maiden's Tragedy. He was cast in their production of Ben Jonson's Catiline in the same year, and in their Bonduca, c. 1613. He became a sharer in the King's Men in 1619, perhaps succeeding Richard Cowley; and he was cast in their revival of Webster's The Duchess of Malfi c. 1621. Robinson reportedly played the part of Wittipol in Jonson's The Devil is an Ass in 1616. In the printed text of that play (1631), Jonson praises Robinson's acting of female roles and calls him an "ingenious youth." Robinson played the role of Aesopus in the company's 1626 production of Massinger's The Roman Actor, and Count Orsinio in Lodowick Carlell's The Deserving Favourite (1629).

Robinson is included in the cast lists for the company's productions of Bonduca, The Double Marriage, A Wife for a Month, and The Wild Goose Chase, plays in the canon of John Fletcher and his collaborators.

According to the last will and testament of Nicholas Tooley, Robinson owed Tooley £29 13s. in 1623; Tooley forgave the debt in his will. Robinson married Winifred Burbage (d.1642), the widow of Richard Burbage. Together with Cuthbert Burbage, William Heminges, Joseph Taylor and John Lowin, Robinson and his wife, Winifred, filed a Bill of Complaint on 28 January 1632 in the Court of Requests against the owner of the Globe, Sir Matthew Brend, in order to obtain confirmation of an extension of the 31-year lease originally granted by Sir Matthew Brend's father, Nicholas Brend.

Robinson was one of the King's Men who signed the dedication of the first Beaumont and Fletcher folio in 1647.

Seventeenth-century sources, including James Wright's Historia Histrionica (1699), falsely report that Robinson was killed in the siege of Basing House in October 1645, during the English Civil War. Richard Robinson was probably confused with another actor with a similar name; there was more than one Robinson in Caroline era theatre —; though the actor in question was most likely comedian and fellow King's Man William Robbins. In fact, Richard Robinson was buried at St. Anne's Church, in Blackfriars, on 23 March 1648.
