= John Clavell =

17th-century highwayman, writer, lawyer, and doctor

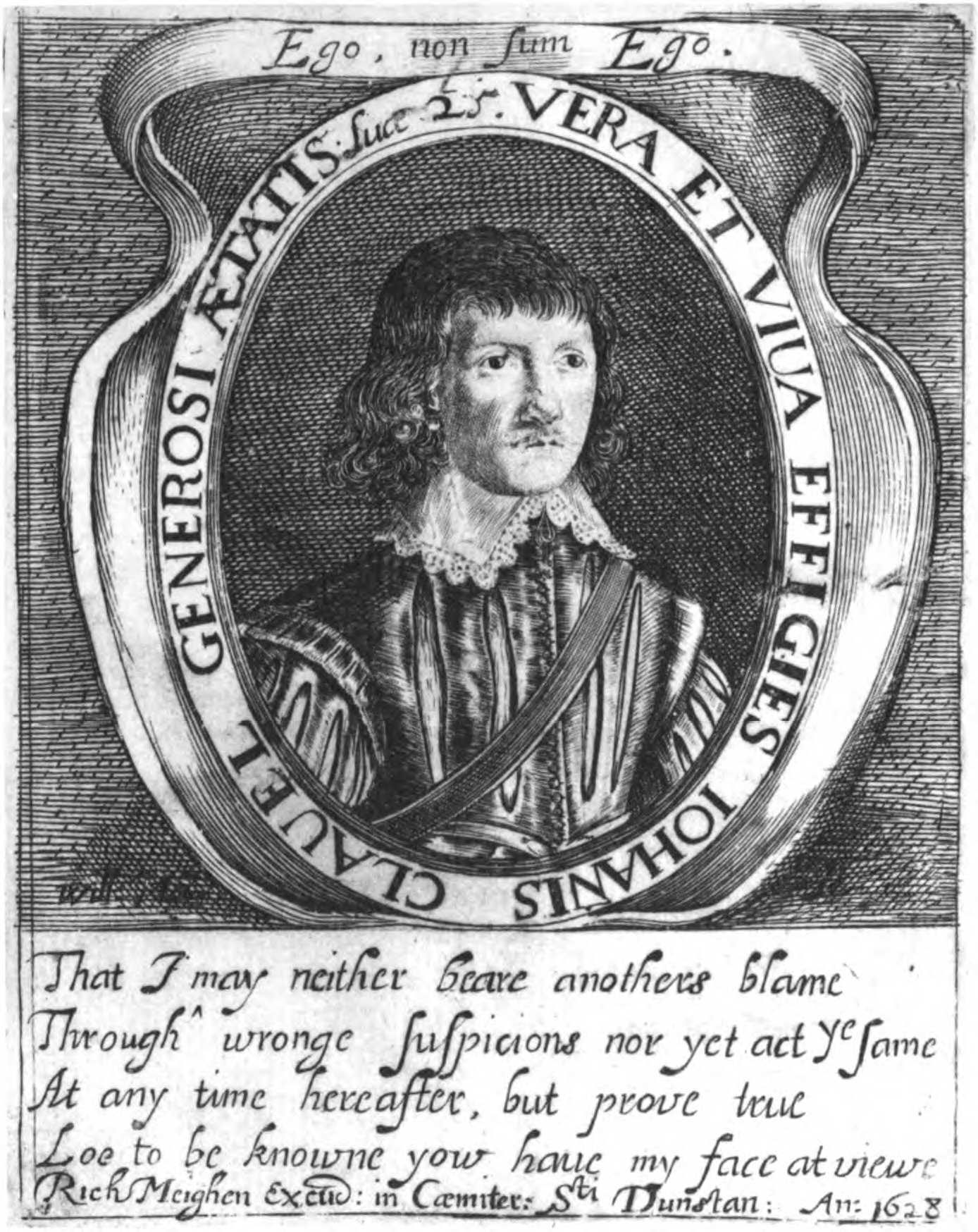
- A portrait of John Clavell from 1628 by William Marshall
- Born: c. 1601; Wootton Glanville, England
- Died: 1643
- Occupations: Highwayman; author; lawyer; doctor
- Years active: c. 1621–1643
- Era: Jacobean; Caroline

Signature
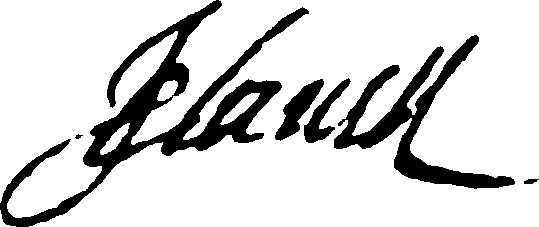

John Clavell (c. 1601–1643) was a highwayman, writer, lawyer, and medical doctor. He is known for his poem A Recantation of an Ill Led Life, and his play The Soddered Citizen. His life is mainly split into two parts: his early life in England, where he grew up, lived as a highwayman, and started his reformation, and the latter part of his life in England and Ireland where he was a lawyer and physician.

== Early life and family ==
John Clavell was the youngest of six children. He was baptized at Wootton Glanville and grew up in Sherborne, England where he spent 18 years of his life. Clavell's heritage comes from an 11th-century family, the Clavell family.

John Clavell's parents were Frances and John Clavell Senior. Clavell's father was plagued by a life of financial trouble; he borrowed money from his son-in-law Robert Freake, but never paid off the loan. He was said to have attended "Spiritual Court" for "moral behaviour"; allegedly he engaged in an affair while married to Frances. Clavell Sr. played an important role in pardoning his son later in life.

Clavell's mother, Frances, married three times and outlived all of her children. Unlike her husband, she did not take part in requesting a pardon for her son when he was jailed. Frances also disapproved of John's first wife, Joyce, which led Clavell to address his mother in the second edition of "A Recantation of an Ill Led Life," where he asks both her and his sister Elizabeth to accept Joyce as a good wife.

John Clavell's uncle was Sir William Clavell (1568–1643). He was a knight banneret and gained this title in 1599. He was active in commercial and industrial ventures, and was John Clavell's connection to Ireland, where Clavell spent part of his life.

== Education ==
John Clavell attended Brasenose College, Oxford, from 1619 to 1621. In 1621, he left the college without a degree. During this period, Clavell is noted to have stolen a golden or silver plate. He was sentenced to time in jail, but was pardoned in April 1621 and released without bail. It is theorized that his uncle Sir William played a major role in his receiving the pardon, and that the theft is the reason Clavell left Brasenose without a degree.

== Adult years ==
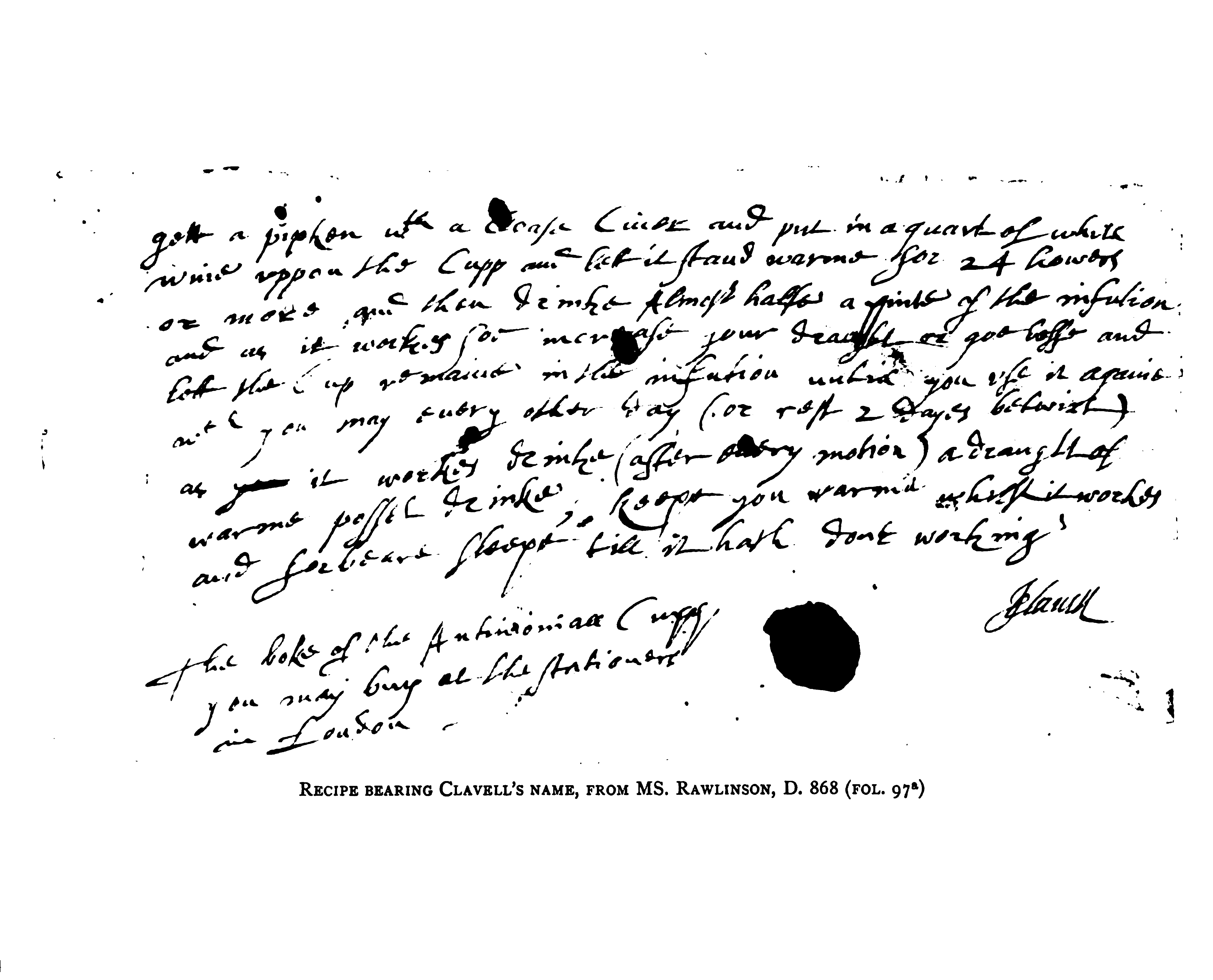
A letter from Clavell

After he left university in 1621, Clavell spent the next five years in London, where he lived a life of crime, poverty and ill health. In 1623 he became the administrator to his father's estate. In 1625 he married his first wife, Joyce. It is believed that she was of low standing and little inheritance; in the second edition of "A Recantation of an Ill Led Life" Clavell appealed to his mother and sister to accept Joyce as a good woman.

In 1625 Clavell was imprisoned in King's Bench Prison as a convicted felon. In 1627 he was apprehended, found guilty and sentenced to death. It is said that he owed his pardon in 1627 to the King and Queen.

Eventually, Clavell found his way to Ireland. Some think he went there in 1631, but the actual date is disputed. On 14 April 1635, Clavell married a Dublin heiress, who was noted to be younger than ten years old. Clavell's records of cures from his times as a doctor are recorded in a manuscript, Bodleian MS. Rawl, D. 399, which dates from 1636 and places Clavell in Ireland around this time.

In 1638, a lawsuit over money owed to Clavell's brother-in-law Robert Freake places Clavell back in England.

The exact date of John Clavell's death is unknown. One document says he died in 1642 where another document says he died in 1643.

== Works ==
=== A Recantation of an Ill Led Life ===
A Recantation of an Ill Led Life is a metrical autobiography and a poem in which Clavell apologizes about all his misdealings. In it, Clavell writes about being a highway man and sends a warning to travelers. In this piece, Clavell also writes to everyone who helped him reach a pardon from his death sentence.

The first edition was entered into the Stationers' Register on 22 September 1627, and was first published in 1628.

The second edition was also published in 1628, but is slightly different because of the aforementioned address to his mother and sister, asking them to accept his first wife, Joyce. The third edition was written in 1634 and contains everything except the address to his mother and sister. All three volumes were published in Clavell's lifetime by Richard Meighen, who also published "The Soddered Citizen".

In his poem, Clavell provides details of the activities of the "knights of the roads." At one point he specifies the disguises they employed:

"But first pluck off your vizards, hoods, disguise,
Masks, muzzles, mufflers, patches from your eyes,
Those beards, those heads of hair, and that great wen,
Which is not natural, that I may ken
Your faces as they are....

=== The Soddered Citizen ===
The Soddered Citizen is a comedic play which is thought to have been written between 1629 and 1634. It was acted by the King's Men at the Blackfriars Theatre in 1630. That play was lost for three centuries, known only by its title. A surviving manuscript was then discovered in 1932, edited by W. W. Greg and J. H. P. Pafford, and published by the Malone Society in 1936.

Until the discovery of the manuscript in 1932 the play was generally ascribed to Shackerley Marmion. However, Clavell's signature was found on the manuscript, and events in his life match up with the prologue. Also, he was assumed to be in Ireland at the same time as the manuscript was produced. Other sources believe that John Clavell could not have written it, because they trace the date that it is written before 1630 (with the death of actor Richard Sharp) - before John Clavell travelled to Ireland.

John Clavell and Shakespeare's Falstaff

Some sources speculate that John Clavell was influenced by Shakespeare's character Sir John Falstaff from Henry IV as a source for ideas in A Recantation. Both Henry IV and A Recantation reference Gad's Hill, the place of the robbery in Henry IV, but there is no documentation of Clavell actually being at Gad's Hill. Clavell claims that the first robbery was at Gad's Hill.
