= The Double Marriage =

Play by John Fletcher and Philip Massinger

The Double Marriage is a Jacobean era stage play, a tragedy written by John Fletcher and Philip Massinger, and initially printed in the first Beaumont and Fletcher folio of 1647.

== Date and performance ==
Though firm evidence on the play's date of authorship and early stage history is lacking, scholars usually assign the play to the 1619–22 period. It was acted by the King's Men, with Joseph Taylor playing the lead – a production that must have occurred after Taylor joined that company in the spring of 1619. The play's absence from the fairly thorough Revels Office records of Sir Henry Herbert probably indicates a date prior to May 1622, when Herbert first occupied the office of Master of the Revels. The cast list added to the play in the second Beaumont and Fletcher folio of 1679 mentions, in addition to Taylor, John Lowin, Robert Benfield, Richard Robinson, John Underwood, Nicholas Tooley, George Birch, and Richard Sharpe.

The Double Marriage, like many of the plays in Fletcher's canon, was revived during the Restoration era. It was acted as late as 6 February 1688 at Whitehall Palace. A revival in the 1671–72 period was given a Prologue, perhaps written by Aphra Behn, which was re-used for Behn's Abdelazer (1677) and, as an Epilogue, for Behn's The Widow Ranter (1690).

== Authorship ==
Scholars have been able to differentiate the respective contributions of Fletcher and Massinger in the play. Cyrus Hoy, in his wide-ranging survey of authorship problems in Fletcher's canon, provided this breakdown, which resembles the verdicts of earlier critics:

Massinger — Act I; Act III, scene 1; Act IV, 2; Act V, 3 and 4;
Fletcher — Act II; Act III, scenes 2 and 3; Avt IV, 1, 3, and 4; Act V, scenes 1 and 2.

The authorship division is unsurprising for the two collaborators; it resembles their shares in The Spanish Curate, in which Massinger handled the main plot and Fletcher the subplot. There is no distinct subplot in The Double Marriage; in this play, Fletcher took primary responsibility for the "underworld" elements about the pirates, and Massinger the "overworld" of the royal court of Naples, as is typical of him. (Massinger as collaborator – as with Nathan Field in The Fatal Dowry, and with Thomas Dekker in The Virgin Martyr — tended to handle "upper-crust" materials: kings and dukes; royal courts and law courts; aristocrats, noble families, and great houses. He relied on his co-workers for materials involving lower classes, the common people, the beau monde of fashion, and criminals and clowns and similar elements. The Double Marriage conforms to this pattern.) It appears that Massinger revised the play after Fletcher's death; Fletcher's characteristic preference for ye instead of you was toned down in Massinger's revision.

== Sources ==
The dramatists drew their plot from two tales in The Orator (1596) by "Lazarus Pyott" (perhaps a pseudonym of Anthony Munday). The characters' names derive from The Historie of Philip De Commines, in Thomas Danett's English translation (1596/1601). [See: Philippe de Commines.] Fletcher may also have drawn upon the Controversiae of Seneca the Elder.

== Synopsis ==
Naples suffers under the rule of a brutal and capricious despot, the "libidinous Tyrant" Ferrant. The opening scene shows the "noble Gentleman" Virolet brooding about the political situation. His wife Juliana questions him about his neglect of her; Virolet assures her that it is not lack of affection on his part, but his preoccupation with tyranny that keeps him from her bed. When she challenges him to do something about Ferrant's despotism, Virolet informs her that the plan is already in motion.

When Virolet meets with his co-conspirators, however, he is appalled to find that they've accepted Ronvere, the commander of Ferrant's guard, as a member. Ronvere tells them that he has lost his post and is disaffected with Ferrant, but Virolet disbelieves his story; and when he learns that Ronvere has brought others into the rebels' plot, Virolet realises that their plan is hopeless. He accepts Juliana's advice to hide in a cave under their house when the would-be rebels are arrested; but Juliana and her father Pandulpho are rounded up with the others.

Ferrant is shown in his court; he is paranoiac and ruthless. Determined to capture Virolet, whom he recognises as the key to the revolt, he tortures Juliana on the rack—though she defies him with remarkable courage. Ferrant seems moved by her bravery, and offers the conspirators a pardon—on the condition that they, led by Virolet, battle the pirates plaguing his coast. The pirates are commanded by the Duke of Sesse, a nobleman who has led a successful resistance against Ferrant for the past fourteen years. Most recently, Sesse has captured Ascanio, Ferrant's nephew and heir. If the conspirators defeat Sesse as a sign of their loyalty, all is forgiven. In a private conversation with Ronvere, though, Ferrant reveals that his motive is selfish political manipulation—he is pitting his enemies against each other, and whoever loses, Ferrant wins.

The scene shifts to the Duke of Sesse's pirate ship, and shows his loyal crew—his Boatswain, Gunner, and other crewmen, and most notably Sesse's bold "Amazon" daughter Martia. Sesse is a noble outlaw in the style of Robin Hood; his controlling motive is opposition to Ferrant. Sesse and his crew engage an approaching ship in combat, and win the fight; Virolet, the captain, is seized, and the rest of the opposing crew and their ship are sent to the bottom. Sesse originally intends to kill Virolet too; but his bold defiance provokes Martia, and Sesse allows his daughter to do what she will with the prisoner.

Virolet is shown locked in the "bilboes" (shackles) with Ascanio, who turns out to be a noble and humane young man who has tried to moderate his uncle's rule, though without success. Martia confronts the two prisoners, and reveals that she has fallen in love with Virolet; she will free them and escape with them, if Virolet agrees to marry her. Virolet protests that he is already married, but Martia doesn't care. Without a better option, Virolet agrees to her bargain. Martia, Virolet, and Ascanio flee in the ship's longboat, and Sesse and his crew, becalmed, cannot follow. But Sesse vows revenge on his turncoat daughter: "She runs hot like a whore...."

Back in Naples, Ferrant welcomes Ascanio and appears to pardon Virolet as well. Juliana, trying to recover from her torture on the rack, is delighted at Virolet's return—until he presents her with Martia, and informs her that their marriage is over. (He obtains a divorce, on the grounds that Juliana cannot have children...due to the effects of her torture.) Once Virolet and Martia are married, however, Martia is stunned when her new husband abandons her before their marriage is consummated. By marrying Martia, Virolet has fulfilled his promise—but that is as far as he will go with her. He remains sexually faithful to Juliana. (This is the "double marriage" of the title.) Martia is outraged, and shifts from love of Virolet to hatred and revenge.

Sesse and his crew come to Naples in pursuit of Martia; they disguise themselves as "Switzers" (Swiss mercenaries, common in Italy at the time) and take service under Ferrant and Ronvere. To obtain her vengeance on Virolet, Martia joins with Ronvere and is introduced to Ferrant; he fancies her, and seats her next to him on his throne. Sesse and his crew launch a rebellion, and the discontented populace rise with them; Ferrant and his supporters retreat to the tower of his castle. In the tumult of the rebellion, Virolet disguises himself as Ronvere, in an attempt to reach Ferrant; Juliana, mistaking him for the true Ronvere, kills him. Juliana discovers her mistake, and dies of grief and the effects of her ordeal.

The rebels are victorious, and are shown with Ferrant's severed head. Martia is unrepentant, and gloats over the deaths of Virolet and Juliana. A disgusted Sesse is about to kill her when his Boatswain intervenes and stabs Martia to death—to save Sesse from the shame of killing his own child. The Neapolitans hail Sesse as their new king—but Sesse, never motivated by a taste for personal power, refuses, and instead nominates Ascanio, "warn'd by the example" of his uncle's fate to be a better ruler.

The play's comic relief is supplied by Ferrant's jester Villio and by Castruccio, a court sycophant and parasite.

== Stagecraft ==
The Double Marriage contains some dramatic stage business: Juliana's torture on the rack is shown onstage, as is the fight between Sesse's and Virolet's ships in Act II. This raises questions as to how these elements were presented in the original production.
