= The Noble Gentleman =

Jacobean era stage play

The Noble Gentleman is a Jacobean era stage play, a comedy in the canon of John Fletcher and his collaborators that was first published in the first Beaumont and Fletcher folio of 1647. It is one of the plays in Fletcher's canon (see Love's Cure and Thierry and Theodoret for other examples) that presents significant uncertainties about its date and authorship.

== Performance ==
The earliest certain fact known about the play is that it was licensed for performance by Sir Henry Herbert, the Master of the Revels, on 3 February 1626 (new style). The play was acted by the King's Men at the Blackfriars Theatre.

== Authorship ==
Broadly speaking, there are two competing scenarios for The Noble Gentleman:

- The play is a "Beaumont and Fletcher play" – either a direct and overt collaboration between the two dramatists, or a work by Beaumont that was later revised by Fletcher. In the context of this hypothesis, dates for the play have been postulated that range from 1606 to 1613.
- The play is a later work written by Fletcher without Beaumont's participation; it may have been left unfinished at Fletcher's death in 1625 and been completed by someone else.

Cyrus Hoy, who favored the first of these interpretations, provided this breakdown of the authors' putative contributions in his survey of authorship problems in Fletcher's canon:

Beaumont – Act I, scene 4; Act II, 2; Act III, 1, 3, and 4; Act IV, 3-5;
Fletcher – Act I, scenes 1-3; Act II, 1; Act III, 2; Act IV, 1 and 2; Act V.

Earlier researchers had provided comparable divisions. Other scholars, however, have judged the evidence of Beaumont's presence too weak to be persuasive. Darren Freebury-Jones has proposed that John Ford was responsible for completing the play after Fletcher died in 1625.

== Date ==
Commentators who advocate Beaumont's authorial contribution must postulate a date of authorship prior to Beaumont's 1613 retirement and 1616 death, in the face of a lack of evidence. Conversely, Fletcher is supposed by some calculations to have worked on eleven plays in the last four years of his life; adding a twelfth stretches the credulity of some commentators. A compromise view, that Fletcher did a late (c. 1625) revision of a much earlier play that contained Beaumont's work, may have merit.

== After 1660 ==
Like the majority of the plays in Fletcher's canon, The Noble Gentleman was both revived and adapted into new forms during the Restoration era. Thomas D'Urfey's adaptation, called A Fool's Preferment, was licensed on 31 May 1688.

== The plot ==
The play is a farcical comedy about a benign but not very sensible French gentleman, Monsieur Mount-Marine, who has an ambition to become a great courtier. His sensible wife is concerned about the possible negative consequences of this lofty ambition. With the help of friends, she manages to fool her husband into believing that the King of France has promoted him to the rank of knight...then, baron...then, earl...then, duke, all in quick succession. But his precipitate (fictitious) rise in society is matched by an equally vertiginous (and fictitious) decline in wealth; by the end of the play, Mount-Marine is convinced that he retains his title of Duke of Burgundy, though he must never mention it to strangers. His situation is paralleled by that of another character, Chatillion, who has been driven slightly mad by love and fancies himself a claimant to the throne of France. As a result, he believes himself surrounded by perils – all in his own imagination.
