= The Captain (play) =

Play by Francis Beaumont and John Fletcher

The Captain is the title of a Jacobean era stage play, a comedy written by Francis Beaumont and John Fletcher. It was originally published in the first Beaumont and Fletcher folio of 1647.

== Performance and publication ==
The play was acted at Court by the King's Men during the Christmas season of 1612–13 (the season that saw the lavish celebration of the wedding of King James I's daughter Princess Elizabeth with Frederick V, Elector Palatine); the company performed the play again at Court in May 1613. The partial cast list published with the play in the second Beaumont and Fletcher folio of 1679 mentions Richard Burbage, Henry Condell, William Ostler, and Alexander Cooke. Since Ostler joined the King's Men almost certainly in 1609, the play is judged to have originated in the 1609–12 period.

The play was revived in the Restoration era, but does not seem to have been particularly popular, or to have been staged often.

== Authorship ==
The consensus of scholarship agrees on the authorship of the play. Unlike some other Beaumont and Fletcher plays such as A King and No King, The Maid's Tragedy, and The Woman Hater, in which Beaumont is the dominant partner, The Captain shows Fletcher's hand predominating. Cyrus Hoy, in his survey of authorship problems in the canon of Fletcher and his collaborators, produced this breakdown between the two playwrights' respective shares:

Fletcher – Acts I, II, and III; Act IV, scenes 1–3; Act V, 1–2;
Beaumont – Act IV, 4;
Beaumont and Fletcher – Act V, 3–5

— a schema that agrees with the conclusions of earlier critics.

== The play ==
Commentators who object to the ethical and moral tone of works in the Beaumont/Fletcher canon have found The Captain to be a prime offender. Critic Robert Ornstein castigated the incest scene in The Captain for its "disgusting prurience."

The Captain tells a story with clear general resemblances to the earlier The Woman Hater; the earlier play might be considered Beaumont's version, and the later one Fletcher's, of the same dramatic concept. Jacomo, the title character of The Captain, is another misogynist, and the heroine Frank loves him and finds a way to reform him and win him. (In each play, the misogynistic protagonist gets bound to a chair by the play's coterie of female characters.) In the parallel plot, Julio and Angelo are both in love with the "cunning wanton widow" Lelia.

The play is notable for its overt challenge to its audience's expectations and sense of plausibility. At the end, Julio engages in a surprise marriage to Frank's witty friend Clora; and his boon companion Angelo comments wryly:

If a marriage

Should be thus slobber'd up in a play,
Ere almost anybody had taken notice
You were in love, the spectators would take it
To be ridiculous. (V,v)
