= The Honest Man's Fortune =

Play by Nathan Field, John Fletcher and Philip Massinger

The Honest Man's Fortune is a Jacobean era stage play, a tragicomedy written by Nathan Field, John Fletcher, and Philip Massinger. It was apparently the earliest of the works produced by this trio of writers, the others being The Queen of Corinth and The Knight of Malta.

== Texts ==
The Honest Man's Fortune exists in two versions. The play received its initial publication in the first Beaumont and Fletcher folio in 1647; it also survives in a manuscript dated 1613, identified as MS. Dyce 9 in the collection of the Victoria and Albert Museum in London. The MS. differs in some particulars from the printed text, most notably in its omission of Act V, scene iii and its alternate ending to the play's final scene.

The manuscript was produced by Edward Knight, the "book-keeper" or prompter of the King's Men. The last page of the manuscript contains permission for performance from Sir Henry Herbert, the Master of the Revels, dated 8 February 1624 (or 1625, new style), a license confirmed in Herbert's own records. The play had passed into the possession of the King's Men as had several other plays from the Lady Elizabeth's company, along with key members (Field, Taylor, Benfield, Ecclestone). The King's Men's manuscript of 1624/5 was probably prepared for use as a prompt book for an intended revival, the original prompt book having been lost. Knight's MS. was likely made from the three authors' "foul papers" or working draft.

Knight's manuscript "corrects some slips made in the 1647 Folio version, simplifies the language, makes a number of cuts, some of them probably by Herbert as censor, omits one scene from the last act and alters the conclusion."

== Date and performance ==
The play's text in the second Beaumont and Fletcher folio of 1679 is prefaced by a cast list for the original production, which cites Nathan Field, Joseph Taylor, Robert Benfield, William Ecclestone, Emanuel Read, and Thomas Basse. This combination of personnel indicates that the play was premiered by the Lady Elizabeth's Men at the Whitefriars Theatre in the 1612–13 period. The production must have occurred before Ecclestone's departure from that company in 1613, which is consistent with the date on the manuscript.

== Authorship ==
Nineteenth-century scholars recognised that the play had multiple authors, based on its profile of internal evidence; critics beginning with F. G. Fleay proposed several potential authors working in combination, including Fletcher, Massinger, Field, Robert Daborne, Cyril Tourneur, and John Webster. Cyrus Hoy, in his wide-ranging study of authorship shares in the Fletcher canon, argued that both the printed and manuscript texts reveal the hands of Fletcher, Massinger, and Field. Hoy determined that the play is "very largely" the work of Field, but also that the collaboration among the writers is close and complex and cannot fully be split among the scenes of the play. Insofar as an Act/scene division is possible and meaningful, Hoy offered this assignment:

Field – Acts I and II; Act III, scenes 1b (after Montague's entrance) and 2; Act IV;
Field and Fletcher – Act V, scenes 1 and 4;
Field and Massinger – Act III, scene 3;
Fletcher – Act V, scenes 2 and 3;
Massinger – Act III, scene 1a (to Montague's entrance).

== Scholarship and criticism ==
In 1952 Johan Gerritsen published a critical edition specifically of the manuscript version of the play, covering essential aspects of the subject. (Gerritsen assigned the play to Field, Fletcher, and Tourneur.) More recently, the play has attracted critical attention for its treatment of sexual themes, what one commentator has called "the faithful page/loving heroine/boy player/catamite nexus."

== Synopsis ==
The play's plot turns on a conflict among three French noblemen. The Duke of Orleans is a rich and powerful aristocrat, arrogant and ruthless, "a spleenful detracting Lord." He resents Montague because Montague had courted his Duchess before the Duke married her; and the Duke has chosen to vent his spleen by suing for control of the lands that provide Montague his income. The Duke's suit has no true merit; but he has the wealth and influence to "corrupt a jury, and make a judge afraid" – and through "false witnesses" and perjured testimony he wins the lawsuit. Montague, suddenly in deep financial trouble, has to dismiss his retainers, including his loyal page Veramour. The intensity of Veramour's attachment to Montague has an almost erotic quality to it, a fact noted by several characters in the play. The page remains devoted to his old master even after Montague has placed Veramour in the household of Lamira, a wealthy, single, and much sought-after young lady.

Orleans turns his malice toward his wife as well, accusing her of infidelity with Montague. This provokes Lord Amiens, the Duchess's brother; the two men quarrel, and are about to duel when the Duchess breaks in upon them and confesses that her husband's accusation is true. Amiens then goes in search of Montague, to fight him over the dishonor to his family – but the Duchess follows, and protests that her first admission was a falsehood, told to stop the duel. Once Amiens withdraws, Montague and the Duchess are left alone, and their conversation reveals that their former courtship was chaste and honourable. (Montague makes a sexual advance to her, only to express his satisfaction when it is rejected – one of those "chastity tests" that are such a striking feature of the plays of the era, especially those of Fletcher.)

Two of Montague's cashiered followers are gentlemen named Longaville and Duboys. They decide to seek employment by staging a fake quarrel over the affair between Orleans and Amiens, in the hope that this will win them places as the noblemen's retainers. Both Orleans and Amiens hear about the matter; the ruthless Orleans is quick to take Duboys into his service, and instructs him to murder Montague. Amiens reacts oppositely, resentful that his affairs are being bandied about by ruffians in the street; but once he meets Longaville and judges him worthy of patronage, Amiens takes the man into his service as well.

Montague tries to recoup his fortunes by investing his last 500 crowns. But he has the bad luck to fall in with disreputable associates: a merchant named Mallicorn, the "knavish Courtier" Laverdine, and an unemployed sea captain called La-Poope. Mallicorn takes Montague's money, then arranges to have him arrested for some small debts. As Montague is being led away to debtors' prison by officers and creditors, Duboys arrives, ostensibly to fulfill Orleans' order of murder; but Duboys arranges the confrontation so that Montague can grab his sword. Montague fights his way free, though he kills an officer in doing so; he escapes, wounded.

The scene shifts to the garden of Lamira's country estate, where Veramour the page has entered service. The Duchess of Orleans is present too, having found sanctuary with Lamira when her husband drove her out of his house. They are enjoying the quiet scene, and commenting on their pleasant seclusion from the corrupt city – when the wounded Montague bursts in upon them. Lamira provides him shelter and aid, and Montague, having no other present recourse, enters into her service.

Soon, Laverdine, Mallicorn, and La-Poope arrive to pay court to Lamira; they meet and mock Montague for his decline in status. Laverdine, though a suitor to Lamira, is strongly attracted to Veramour, and convinces himself that the page is actually a woman in disguise. He propositions the page sexually, though Veramour tells Laverdine that he would "rather lie with my lady's monkey."

Amiens employs Longaville to deliver a challenge to Orleans; after doing so, however, Logaville goes to Lamira's house to inform the Duchess. She, Lamira, and Montague arrive at the intended duel's location to try to stop it. In the confusion, Longaville discharges a pistol and the shot seems to strike the Duchess; she falls. Orleans, thinking that his wife has been killed, is shocked out of his pose of arrogant self-importance. It turns out that the Duchess has only fainted; Longaville had charged his pistol with gunpowder but no lead ball, hoping to frighten Orleans into abandoning the duel with Amiens.

The abortive duel and Orleans' change of heart provide the resolution of the plot. Lamira holds a banquet at which she announces that she will choose a husband from among her suitors. To the surprise and displeasure of Mallicorn, La-Poope, and Laverdine, she selects Montague, who reproves the other three for their presumption in seeking the hand of a lady so far above them. The now-repentant Orleans decides to restore Montague's rightful estates to him. With Montague's fortunes restored, Duboys and Longaville can be his retainers once again. (The dead officer is conveniently forgotten.) Laverdine attempts to recover from Lamira's rejection by revealing that he has formed an alliance with Veramour, who appears in a woman's gown; but it quickly transpires that Veramour is playing a joke on the courtier – he wears his boy's "breeches" underneath the gown, and reveals the truth to Laverdine's humiliation.

== See also ==
- Playwrights
  - Nathan Field
  - John Fletcher
  - Philip Massinger

== Sources ==
- Bowers, Fredson, general editor. The Dramatic Works in the Beaumont and Fletcher Canon, Vol. X. Cambridge, Cambridge University Press, 1996.
- Gerritsen, Johan. "The Honest Mans Fortune": A Critical Edition of MS Dyce 9 (1625). Groningen and Djakarta, J. B. Wolters, 1952.
- Gurr, Andrew. The Shakespeare Company 1594–1642. Cambridge, Cambridge University Press, 2004.
- Hoy, Cyrus. "The Shares of Fletcher and His Collaborators in the Beaumont and Fletcher Canon (IV)." Studies in Bibliography 12 (1959), pp. 91–116.
- Ioppolo, Grace. Dramatists and Their Manuscripts in the Age of Shakespeare, Jonson, Middleton and Heywood. London, Routledge, 2006.
- Logan, Terence P., and Denzell S. Smith, eds. The Later Jacobean and Caroline Dramatists: A Survey and Bibliography of Recent Studies in English Renaissance Drama. Lincoln, NE, University of Nebraska Press, 1978.
- Oliphant, E. H. C. The Plays of Beaumont and Fletcher: An Attempt to Determine Their Respective Shares and the Shares of Others. New Haven, Yale University Press, 1927.
- Senelick, Laurence. The Changing Room: Varieties of Theatrical Cross-Dressing. London, Routledge, 2000.
- Shapiro, Michael. Gender in Play on the Shakespearean Stage: Boy Heroines and Female Pages. Ann Arbor, MI, University of Michigan Press, 1994.
