= Thierry and Theodoret =

Jacobean era stage play

Thierry and Theodoret is a Jacobean era stage play, a tragedy in the canon of John Fletcher and his collaborators that was first published in 1621. It is one of the problematic plays of Fletcher's oeuvre; as with Love's Cure, there are significant uncertainties about the date and authorship of Thierry and Theodoret.

== Publication ==
The first edition of the play is the 1621 quarto issued by the bookseller Thomas Walkley, with no attribution of authorship. The second quarto of 1648, published by Humphrey Moseley, assigned the play to Fletcher alone, but the third quarto of the following year (1649), also from Moseley, cites Francis Beaumont and John Fletcher on its title page. The play was included in the second Beaumont and Fletcher folio of 1679, though the text there is truncated and omits a substantial part of the work's conclusion.

== Authorship ==
Early critics attributed the play to Beaumont and Fletcher, Philip Massinger, Nathan Field, Robert Daborne, John Webster, and George Chapman, in various combinations. Most modern scholarship accepts the play as a work originally by Beaumont and Fletcher that was later revised by Massinger, comparable to Love's Cure, The Coxcomb, and Beggars' Bush. Cyrus Hoy, in his survey of authorship problems in Fletcher's canon, produced this breakdown of the three authors' shares:

Beaumont – Act III; Act V, scene 1;
Fletcher —Act I, scene 1; Act II, 2 and 3; Act IV, 1; Act V, 2;
Massinger – Act I, scene 2; Act II, 1 and 4; Act IV, 2.

== Date ==
The date of the play is a matter of deep uncertainty and widespread dispute; scholars have ventured dates from 1607 to 1621. If Beaumont was one of the original authors, the first version of the drama obviously must have pre-dated his 1613 retirement and 1616 death. The title page of the first quarto states that the play was acted by the King's Men at the Blackfriars Theatre. This may refer to the revised version; both Fletcher and Massinger worked for the King's Men through much of their careers.

== Synopsis ==
The play opens with a verbal confrontation between Brunhalt and her elder son Theodoret, King of France. Theodoret is reproving his mother for her licentious and libertine lifestyle, criticisms that Brunhalt rejects; she accuses her son of disrespect in merely broaching the subject with her. Theodoret ends the confrontation by telling his mother to prepare to take up a monastic life within ten days. Brunhalt calls forth her principal followers, Bawdber, Lecure, and Protaldie, to tell them the news. The play does not specify details of the queen mother's libidinous behaviour, though Brunhalt is shown kissing her lover Protaldie in the others' presence. Her followers are concerned about facing the legal punishments for sexual impropriety, which include whipping and castration. Brunhalt decides that she and her followers will immediately leave Theodoret's court for that of his younger brother Thierry.

(The play makes Theodoret the king of France, while Thierry rules Austrasia, the northeastern portion of the Frankish domain. The historical facts were different: Theudebert II was king of Austrasia, while Theuderic II spent most of his career as the ruler of Burgundy.)

In the second scene, Theodoret is shown in consultation with his virtuous councillor Martell; the play presents the French king as a dedicated and upright ruler. When Theodoret is informed that Brunhalt and her followers have gone to Thierry's court, he quickly decides to follow her, to forestall any further mischief from her. Brunhalt is shown meeting Thierry, who is outraged at Brunhalt's account of Theodoret's treatment of her. Suddenly, Theodoret himself arrives with his courtiers; he makes a reasonable case for his behaviour, which deflates Thierry's indignation. (The scene constructs a personality portrait of Thierry that prevails through the rest of the play: he is passionate and given to overblown language, but highly impressionable.)

The characters' attention shifts in response to the news that Thierry's fiancée – the fifteen-year-old princess Ordella, daughter of the King of Aragon – has arrived. Brunhalt hates the thought of taking second place to her son's new queen; she and her followers concoct a plot to ruin the marriage. They will administer a potion to Thierry that will leave him impotent for the first five days of his marriage; this will, they think, force an irreparable fissure between the newlyweds, and leave Ordella open to seduction. Brunhalt and her cronies work their plan; the wedding night of Thierry and Ordella is unsuccessful. But Ordella reacts with noble forbearance, patience, and concern for her new husband; Thierry calls her his "saint."

With the failure of her first scheme to waylay Ordella, Brunhalt tries again. She arranges for Thierry to consult a famed magician and astrologer (actually Lecure in disguise) for a prediction on possible heirs to the throne. Lecure tells Thierry that he can father many sons...but only if he kills the first woman who leaves the temple of Diana before dawn the next morning. Thierry is prepared to commit the murder, but he pulls off the woman's veil to discover that the woman is Ordella, and he cannot go through with the act. Martell convinces Ordella to tell him spread a rumour that Ordella has committed suicide.

Thierry has made Protaldie, Brunhalt's lover, the commander of his military forces. Theodoret's minister Martell is eager to expose Protaldie as a poseur and a coward; he challenges Protaldie and gets the man to surrender his sword without a fight. When Martiall presents this fact to the court, however, Protaldie manages to lie his way out of his embarrassment. To buoy his reputation, Brunhalt's sycophants pay De Vitry, an old soldier down on his luck, to challenge Protaldie in public and then take a beating from him. De Vitry accepts the bargain – but then he fails to fulfill it, instead beating Protaldie and revealing the whole scheme to the court.

Protaldie is so humiliated by this that Brunhalt can talk him into overcoming his natural cowardice; at her urging, Protaldie sneaks behind Theodoret's throne during a court celebration and stabs the king in the back, killing him. The passionate Thierry is so outraged that he wants to burn down his own palace around the body as a funeral pyre; Brunhalt talks him out of this plan by admitting that she is responsible for the murder. Brunhalt claims that she was pressured to produce an heir by Thierry's father, but failed for the first years of their marriage; when a pregnancy miscarried, she passed off a gardener's infant child as the heir to the realm. With Theodoret dead, Thierry is elevated to his rightful place as the ruler of France.

In response to Ordella's rumoured suicide, the capricious Thierry decides to marry Memberge, Theodoret's daughter. Brunhalt complains about her son marrying what she calls a gardener's child; but Thierry thinks he can make up for the girl's loss of a father. The frustrated Brunhalt then admits that she lied, and that Thierry will be committing incest if he married Memberge. She also takes her final step along her path of moral degeneration, by poisoning Thierry.

Brunhalt sends Protaldie with a message to Theodoret's bastard son, urging him to rise up and seize power; but Protaldie is intercepted and the message revealed. As Thierry lies dying, unable to sleep, Brunhalt is apprehended and subjected to sleep deprivation as an appropriate punishment. She is forced to watch her lover Protaldie being broken on the wheel; she chokes herself to death in response. Thierry finally succumbs to the poison; and Ordella joins him on his deathbed, dying of a broken heart.

== Criticism ==
Thierry and Theodoret bears a significant relationship with the 1611 Beaumont/Fletcher play A King and No King: "two kings in each play, one of whom in each case is a somewhat furious ranter, the queen mother who loathes her son...." Nineteenth-century critics like Charles Lamb and Edmund Gosse rated Thierry and Theodoret highly, as "the best of Fletcher's tragedies."

== Anachronisms ==
Some critics have commented on the historical anachronisms that were common in English Renaissance drama but are notably glaring in Thierry and Theodoret. The play's plot is based on the careers of Frankish rulers of the late 6th and early 7th centuries, Brunhilda of Austrasia and her grandsons Theuderic II and Theudebert II (transformed in the play into Brunhalt and her sons Thierry and Theodoret), but their soldiers are armed with muskets, and the characters observe the gods of Ancient Greece.
