= The Fair Penitent =

1702 play by Nicholas Rowe

The Fair Penitent. A Tragedy. As It is Acted at the New Theatre in Little Lincoln's-Inn-Fields. By His Majesty’s Servants.
- Author: Nicholas Rowe
- Language: English
- Genre: Tragedy
- Set in: Genoa, Italy
- Publisher: Printed for Jacob Tonson, within Gray's-Inn Gate next Grays-Inn-Lane
- Publication date: 1703
- Publication place: London, England
- Media type: Print (hardcover)
- Pages: 61
- OCLC: 1568293570

The Fair Penitent is Nicholas Rowe's stage adaptation of the tragedy The Fatal Dowry, the Philip Massinger and Nathan Field collaboration first published in 1632. Rowe's adaptation, premiered onstage in 1702 and first published in 1703, was a great popular success through much of the 18th century, and was praised by critics as demanding as Samuel Johnson ("There is scarcely any work of any poet so interesting by the fable and so delightful in the language").

In making his adaptation, Rowe eliminated characters and simplified the action "to create a more focused play than the original." He pursued "neoclassical simplicity" but in the process sacrificed the "underlying moral principles" of the original. Rowe shifted the setting from Dijon to Genoa, and changed the main characters' names.

== Characters ==
Fatal Dowry	Fair Penitent
Rochfort	Sciolto
Charalois	Altamont
Romont	Horatio
Novall Junior	Lothario
Pontalier	Rossano
Beaumelle	Calista
Bellapert	Lucilla

Rowe also accentuated the role of the female protagonist, making the play much more a vehicle for a female star performer, a "better acting piece" for a prominent actress. Where the original "concentrates largely on the legal and political affairs of the cuckolded husband," Rowe focused far more directly on the domestic tragedy of Calista's infidelity.

The original Lincoln's Inn Fields cast included John Bowman as Sciolto, John Verbruggen as Altamont, Thomas Betterton as Horatio, George Powell as Lothario and Elizabeth Barry as Calista. The production also included incidental music and arias written by German-born Baroque composer Jakob Greber for his mistress, operatic soprano Margherita de L'Épine.

The play was revived at both of the major London theatres of the era, Drury Lane and Covent Garden; the former production starred Mrs. Siddons as Calista. The 1703 first edition was dedicated to the Duchess of Ormond—but did not credit the original authors of The Fatal Dowry, leading to later critics' accusations of plagiarism against Rowe, as in William Gifford's edition of Massinger's works.

== Legacy ==
The eponym "Lothario," meaning "a man who seduces women," stems from the character in this play. However, a character named Lothario as a seducer predates the play. It first appeared in 1605 in Miguel de Cervantes novel Don Quixote. In this story Lothario is urged by his lifelong friend Anselmo to attempt to seduce his wife in order to test her faithfulness. At first most unwilling, he eventually enters into the scheme with skill and success.

Malcolm Goldstein edited The Fair Penitent for a modern edition in 1969. Critics, both traditional and modern, have debated whether Calista is actually "penitent" for her infidelity.

== Sources ==
- Brawley, Benjamin Griffith. A Short History of English Drama. New York, Harcourt, Brace, 1921.
- Freeman, Lisa A. Character's Theater: Genre and Identity on the Eighteenth-Century English Stage. Philadelphia, University of Pennsylvania Press, 2001.
- Goldstein, Malcolm, ed. The Fair Penitent. Regents Restoration Drama series; Lincoln, NE, University of Nebraska Press, 1969.
- Howe, Elizabeth. The First English Actresses: Women and Drama 1660–1700. Cambridge, Cambridge University Press, 1992.
- Logan, Terence P., and Denzell S. Smith, eds. The Later Jacobean and Caroline Dramatists: A Survey and Bibliography of Recent Studies in English Renaissance Drama. Lincoln, NE, University of Nebraska Press, 1978.
- Marsden, Jean I. Fatal Desire: Women, Sexuality, and the English Stage, 1660–1720. Ithaca, NY, Cornell University Press, 2006.
