= Lady Elizabeth's Men =

Company of actors in Jacobean London

The Lady Elizabeth's Men, or Princess Elizabeth's Men, was a company of actors in Jacobean London, formed under the patronage of King James I's daughter Princess Elizabeth. From 1618 on, the company was called The Queen of Bohemia's Men, after Elizabeth and her husband the Elector Palatine had their brief and disastrous flirtation with the crown of Bohemia. (In the winter of 1618–19, the two had their brief reign as the King and Queen of Bohemia, to start the Thirty Years' War.)

The company received its royal patent on 27 April 1611; it is thought to have been composed largely of former child actors from the children's troupes – the Children of the Chapel and the Children of Paul's — who were now grown to manhood. They may have started out playing at the Swan Theatre. On 29 August 1611, the company signed a bond with Philip Henslowe; they would rely on Henslowe for financing and would in the future act at Henslowe's new theatre, the Hope.

Soon after their inception, the company was performing in the provinces; but by 1612 they were back in London, and in that year played four times at Court. The Honest Man's Fortune was one of their early offerings; the cast list added to that play in the second Beaumont and Fletcher folio of 1679 names the actors Nathan Field, Joseph Taylor, Robert Benfield, William Ecclestone, Emanuel Read, and Thomas Basse.

In 1613, Lady Elizabeth's Men combined with the Children of Whitefriars; the combined troupe performed A Chaste Maid in Cheapside, by Thomas Middleton, at the Swan in 1613. Sometime in the next year or so, they joined in another combination with Prince Charles's Men. The company acted Ben Jonson's Bartholomew Fair at the newly built Hope Theatre on 31 October 1614.

In 1615 the company had a falling-out with Henslowe, and as a result drew up a list of their grievances, the "Articles of Oppression against Mr. Hinchlowe." Most of their complaints were financial in nature – that Henslowe loaned them money on extortionate terms, and the like; but they also accused Henslowe of withholding play scripts that the actors had paid for, and of having "broken and dismemb'red five companies" in three years.

After Henslowe's death in 1616, the Lady Elizabeth's Men dissolved their bond with Prince Charles's Men, and left London to tour the provinces; they are absent from the extant records of the London theatres for roughly six years. During this era, they lost important cast members. Nathan Field joined the King's Men in 1616. William Ecclestone became a King's Man in 1614, as John Rice did around 1620; Joseph Taylor, who had stayed with Prince Charles's company in 1616 and had become their leading man, replaced Richard Burbage as the King's Men's lead actor when Burbage died in March 1619. The leakage from Lady Elizabeth's troupe included plays as well as personnel: works by John Fletcher and his collaborators that had been in their repertory, including Cupid's Revenge, The Coxcomb, and The Knight of Malta, ended up as King's Men's plays.

The company reappeared in London in 1622. The actors worked for Christopher Beeston; in April 1624, they performed Philip Massinger's The Renegado. Defections continued: in 1624 Eliard Swanston left to join the King's Men. In 1625, the Queen of Bohemia's Men were replaced by, or combined with, the newly created Queen Henrietta's Men.

In 1628 a new charter was granted to a successor company; this version of the troupe toured the provinces and showed little if any activity in London. It disappeared after 1632.

== Repertory ==
The following list includes plays that are known or believed to have been acted by Lady Elizabeth's Men in the years cited, and suggests the general nature of their repertory:

- Chabot, Admiral of France, George Chapman, 1613?
- A Chaste Maid in Cheapside, Thomas Middleton, 1613
- The Coxcomb, Beaumont and Fletcher, ca. 1614
- Bartholomew Fair, Ben Jonson, 1614
- The Changeling, Middleton and William Rowley, 1622
- The Bondman, Philip Massinger, 1623
- The Spanish Gypsy, Dekker, Ford, and Rowley, 1623
- Cupid's Revenge, Beaumont and Fletcher, 1624
- The Captives, Thomas Heywood, 1624
- The Renegado, Massinger, 1624
- Love Tricks, James Shirley, 1625
