= The Laws of Candy =

Jacobean stage play

The Laws of Candy is a Jacobean stage play, a tragicomedy that is significant principally because of the question of its authorship. Critics are unanimous in their verdicts on the low quality of The Laws of Candy; "tiresome" is one of the kinder epithets that have been attached to the work.

== Date ==
The play received its initial publication in the first Beaumont and Fletcher folio of 1647. Scholars judge it to have been written most likely in the 1619–23 period. The play was clearly performed by the King's Men; the cast list for the original production, added to the play in the second Beaumont/Fletcher folio of 1679, includes Joseph Taylor, John Lowin, William Ecclestone, John Underwood, Nicholas Tooley, George Birch, Richard Sharpe, and Thomas Pollard, all members of that company. With that roster of personnel, the play could have premiered anytime between the spring of 1619, when Taylor joined the troupe, and June 1623, when Tooley died.

== Authorship ==
Early scholars were frustrated at their inability to find any evidence of the styles of John Fletcher, or Philip Massinger, or Fletcher's other usual collaborators, in the play. The reason for this began to become clear when William Wells and E. H. C. Oliphant identified the hand of John Ford in the work. Cyrus Hoy, in his wide-ranging and detailed treatment of authorship problems in Fletcher's canon, also confirmed the judgment in favor of Ford's authorship; and while this judgment was controversial for a time, Brian Vickers, writing in 2005, called the attribution to Ford "certain". Ford's canon is so limited in extent, compared to those of other major playwrights of English Renaissance theatre, that an addition to his canon of a full solo play is an important development.

Three of Ford's plays—The Lover's Melancholy, The Broken Heart, and the lost Beauty in a Trance (licensed 28 November 1630)—are known to have been acted by the King's Men, and they are all relatively early Ford plays; this may imply that The Laws of Candy is early as well, which could help to explain its relative crudity. If the play was written as early as 1619 or 1620, it could be the earliest of Ford's extant dramatic works.

== Synopsis ==
The play is set in Crete—"Candy" and "Candia" being archaic names for the island. In Ford's fictional Candy, two unusual laws are in the statute books. One is a (highly impracticable) law against ingratitude: a citizen who is accused of ingratitude by another, and fails to make amends, can be sentenced to death. The second law holds that after a military victory, the soldiers will select the one of their number who has done the most to achieve the success.

The second law is the cause of the play's conflict. The forces of Candy have just won a great victory over the invading Venetians. (Historically, Venice conquered Crete in the early thirteenth century [1209–17] and ruled the island until 1669, though with many rebellions by the local populace.) The commander of the army, Cassilanes, the leading soldier of his generation, expects to receive the acclaim of the troops, and is incensed to find that he has a rival in his own son, Antinous, who has distinguished himself in his first battle. The father's concern is real: Antinous wins the approval of the soldiers. Paradoxically, Cassilanes is even more outraged when Antinous claims his reward from the state—and names a bronze statue of his father. To Cassilanes, this is only one more assertion of the son's assumed power.

Cassilanes is certainly an irascible old man—but he has an additional grievance. He has mortgaged his estates to pay the troops, who otherwise would not have fought; and the state is in no hurry to rectify the matter. The owner of the mortgage is Gonzalo, an ambitious Venetian lord. Gonzalo is the play's Machiavellian villain; he plots and manipulates with the goal of becoming both the king of Candy and the duke of Venice. Gonzalo, however, makes two mistakes. One is that he takes a young Venetian prisoner of war, Fernando, into his confidence, relying on their shared nationality. When Cassilanes retreats to a poverty-stricken retirement, Gonzalo arranges for Fernando to live in the general's little household to further his machinations. Fernando is a noble young man, in mind as well as in birth; and once he falls in love with Cassilanes' daughter Annophel, he reveals Gonzalo's plots.

Gonzalo's second mistake is to fall in love himself, with the princess Erota. The play's list of dramatis personae describes her as "a Princess, imperious, and of an overweaning Beauty." Royal, rich, witty, and beautiful, she is also extravagantly vain; she is loved by many men, including a prince of Cyprus named Philander, but scorns them all. Until, that is, she meets Antinous, and falls in love with him. Motivated by that love, she manipulates the vain Gonzalo into selling her Cassilanes' mortgage, and also into committing his plots and plans to writing.

In the play's final climactic scene, the other odd law of Candy comes into play. Cassilanes comes before the Senate with a complaint of ingratitude against his son; and Antinous, resigned to death, refuses to defend himself. But Erota makes a similar complaint of ingratitude against Cassilanes—which provokes Antinous to make the same complaint against her, in a sort of round-robin festival of egomania. The solution to this tangle comes when Annophel enters and makes her own complaint of ingratitude...against the Senate of Candy, for its treatment of her father.

The befuddled Senate turns the matter over to the Cypriot prince Philander for judgment. Philander prevails on Cassilanes to repent and withdraw his complaint against Antinous, which allows all the subsequent difficulties to be resolved. Almost as an afterthought, the Cretans and Venetians unite in condemning Gonzalo to punishment. Erota's pride is humbled (we know this, since she tells us so herself), and she accepts her most constant (and noble) suitor, Prince Philander, as her spouse.
