= The Nice Valour =

Jacobean play

The Nice Valour, or The Passionate Madman is a Jacobean stage play of problematic date and authorship. Based on its inclusion in the two Beaumont and Fletcher folios of 1647 and 1679 and two citations in 17th-century sources, the play has long held a place in the canon of John Fletcher and his collaborators. Modern scholarship, however, has accumulated much internal evidence for the authorship of Thomas Middleton.

The Nice Valour is the shortest play in the Beaumont/Fletcher folios, and inconsistencies in the text (the setting shifts between France and Genoa with no explanation) suggest revision by a hand other than that of the original author. Early critics, observing obvious differences from the normal style of Fletcher and Beaumont, postulated the participation of Middleton and perhaps William Rowley; their twentieth-century successors were able to refine that determination with a close study of the play's stylistic and linguistic preferences. Cyrus Hoy, in his massive study of authorship questions in the Fletcher canon, drew this division of authorship:

Middleton — Act III; Act V, scene 1;
Fletcher and Middleton — Acts I, II, and IV; Act V, scenes 2 and 3.

David Lake, in his study of authorship problems in the Middleton canon, endorses Hoy's conclusion and supports it with additional evidence. The play's date remains uncertain, and has been placed anywhere from 1615 to 1625. Lake favours Baldwin Maxwell's date of c. 1615–16.

== Synopsis ==
The court of the Duke of Genoa is populated with three unusual characters. One is Shamont, the Duke's favourite and the intended husband of the Duke's sister, the Lady. (Several significant characters in the play are not given personal names, but are known only by their roles—the Lady, the Soldier, etc.—a trait common in Middleton's work.) Shamont is abnormally touchy on points of honour; he has the "nice valour" (that is, finicky pride) of the title. (One unsympathetic courtier calls him a "vainglorious coxcomb"—though not to his face.) A second odd fellow is a kinsman of the Duke, who is subject to wild mood swings, from joy to love to melancholy to rage; he is the "passionate madman" of the subtitle. A modern psychotherapist might diagnose an extreme case of bipolar disorder, a case so severe that the man sometimes hallucinates, and courts, imaginary women. And the third odd duck is a courtier named Lapet, who is a coward; he endures physical abuse rather than fight back.

Trouble is instigated by a visit from Shamont's brother, the Soldier. Shamont sees his brother in conversation with the Lady, and becomes jealous. Later the pair are intruded upon by the Duke's cousin, whose mentally disordered ramblings give the Soldier the impression that he's been insulted. Shamont is so distracted by his jealous imaginings that he fails to notice when the Duke is speaking to him; trying to catch his favourite's attention, the Duke touches Shamont with a riding crop. This is enough to provoke the most extreme reaction from Shamont's hypersensitive honour; convinced that he's been mortally insulted, Shamont vents his feelings and leaves the court.

A second thread of the plot develops around the Duke's kinsman's affliction. The man has courted, seduced, and impregnated a young gentlewoman, but has failed to follow through on his commitment to marry her. Egged on by her brothers, the young woman disguises herself as a Cupid among the court masquers, as part of a plan to manipulate the "passionate madman" to the altar. (The cuts in the play's text prevent this subplot from developing into a coherent story.) The Soldier takes out his wounded pride on the Duke's cousin, assaulting the man at swordpoint, and is arrested for the crime. Shamont is summoned back to court to plead for his brother's pardon; the Duke is so pleased to see his favourite again that the pardon is quickly granted. The Duke's kinsman survives his wound, and the shock of his experience jolts him out of his mental state; he recovers his wits and acknowledges the young woman "Cupid" as his intended bride.

In the middle and later portions of the play are scenes devoted to crude verbal and physical humour on the subject of beatings, being beaten, and physical abuse in general.

The Duke's apology to Shamont after touching him with his whip is thought to represent an incident at court between King James and John Gibb.
