= Beaumont and Fletcher folios =

Collections of plays by John Fletcher and others

The Beaumont and Fletcher folios are two large folio collections of the stage plays of John Fletcher and his collaborators. The first was issued in 1647, and the second in 1679. The two collections were important in preserving many works of English Renaissance drama.

== The first folio, 1647 ==
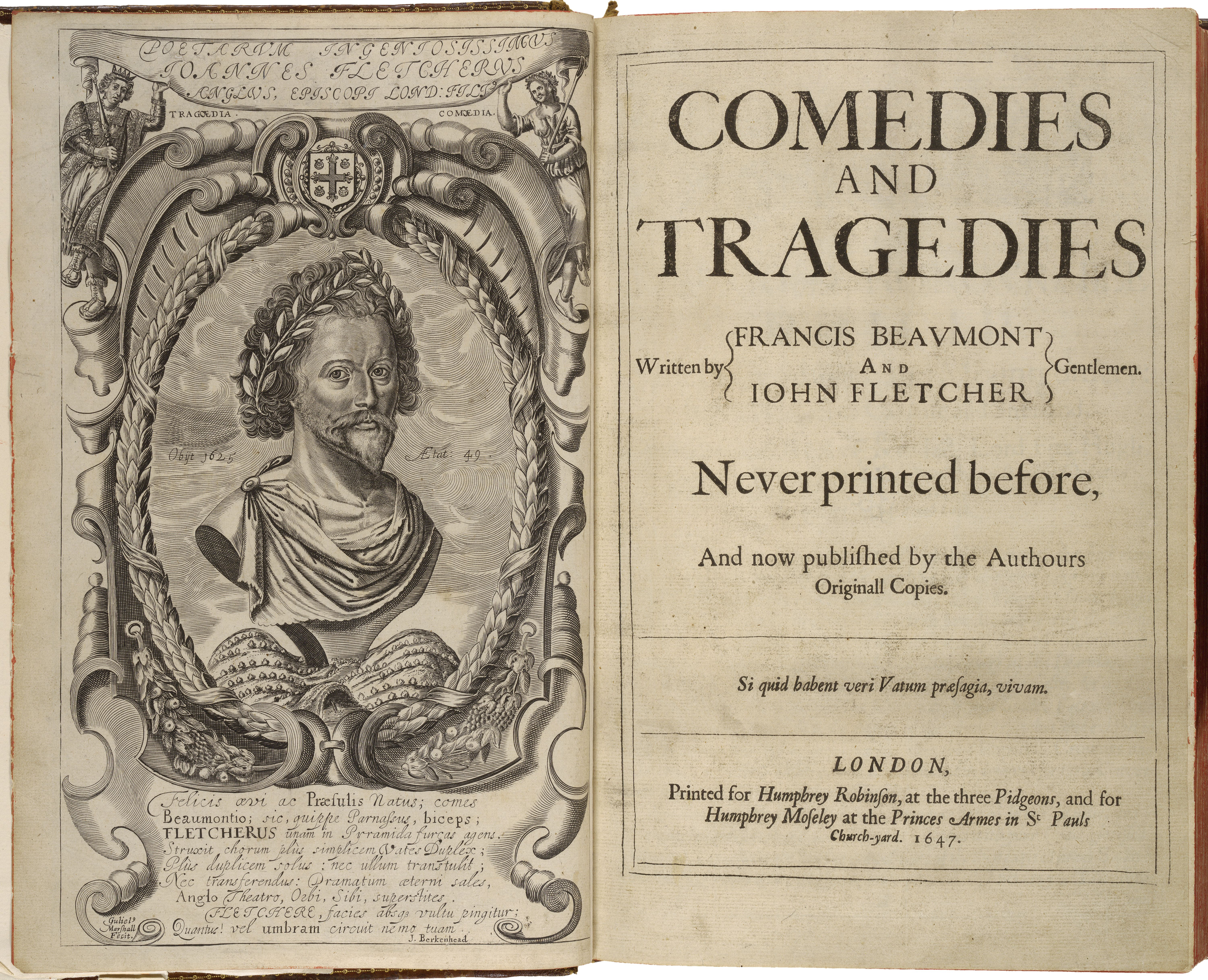
Frontispiece and title page of the first folio (1647)

The 1647 folio was published by the booksellers Humphrey Moseley and Humphrey Robinson. It was modelled on the precedents of the first two folio collections of Shakespeare's plays, published in 1623 and 1632, and the first two folios of the works of Ben Jonson of 1616 and 1640–1. The title of the book was given as Comedies and Tragedies Written by Francis Beaumont and John Fletcher Gentlemen, though the prefatory matter in the folio recognised that Philip Massinger, rather than Francis Beaumont, collaborated with Fletcher on some of the plays included in the volume. (In fact, the 1647 volume "contained almost nothing of Beaumont's" work.) Seventeen works in Fletcher's canon that had already been published prior to 1647, and the rights to these plays belonged to the stationers who had issued those volumes; Robinson and Moseley therefore concentrated on the previously unpublished plays in the Fletcher canon.

Most of these plays had been acted onstage by the King's Men, the troupe of actors for whom Fletcher had functioned as house dramatist for most of his career. The folio featured a dedication to Philip Herbert, 4th Earl of Pembroke, signed by ten of the King's Men – John Lowin, Joseph Taylor, Richard Robinson, Robert Benfield, Eliard Swanston, Thomas Pollard, Hugh Clark, William Allen, Stephen Hammerton, and Theophilus Bird – all idled by the closing of the theatres in 1642. It also contained two addresses to the reader, by James Shirley and by Moseley, and 37 commendatory poems, long and short, by figures famous and obscure, including Shirley, Ben Jonson, Richard Lovelace, Robert Herrick, Richard Brome, Jasper Mayne, Thomas Stanley, and Sir Aston Cockayne.

The 1647 folio contains 35 works – 34 plays and 1 masque.

The 1647 folio has attracted significant attention from scholars and bibliographers, and various specialised studies of the folio (books on the book) have been written. As with Shakespeare's First Folio, the typesetting of individual compositors and the work of individual printers has been traced and analysed – including that of Susan Islip, one of the rare instances of a female printer in the 17th century.

== The second folio, 1679 ==
The second folio, titled Fifty Comedies and Tragedies, was published by the booksellers Henry Herringman, John Martyn, and Richard Marriot; the printing was done by J. Macock. The three stationers had obtained the rights to previously published works, and added 18 dramas to the 35 of the first folio, for a total of 53. The second folio added features that the first lacked. Many songs in the plays were given in full. Cast lists were prefixed to 25 of the dramas, lists that provide the names of the leading actors in the original productions of the plays. These lists can be informative on the companies involved and the dates of first productions; the cast list prefixed to The Honest Man's Fortune, for example, reveals that the play was originally staged by the Lady Elizabeth's Men in the 1612–13 period.

On the negative side, the texts in the second folio were set into type from the previously printed quarto texts, and never from manuscript; the texts of the plays in the first collection were printed from manuscript sources.

== Content, authorship, and canon ==
The implicit canon, nearly realized by the contents of the second folio, comprises dramatic works written by Beaumont or Fletcher; either alone, together, or in collaboration with other playwrights. By this rule, likely, four plays should be excluded (The Laws of Candy by John Ford, Wit at Several Weapons by Middleton and Rowley, The Nice Valour by Middleton, and The Coronation by James Shirley), and three more extant plays should be included (John van Olden Barnavelt, A Very Woman, and Henry VIII). A Very Woman was printed in a volume of Massinger's plays in 1655, while John van Olden Barnavelt remained in manuscript until the 19th century. Henry VIII was first published in the Shakespeare First Folio of 1623.

At least five plays, no longer extant, may also belong in the canon. Four of these were entered to Moseley in the Stationers' Register between 1653 and 1660, possibly with the intent of printing them in the second folio: Cardenio (Shakespeare and Fletcher?), A Right Woman (Beaumont and Fletcher?), The Wandering Lovers (Fletcher?), and The Jeweler of Amsterdam (Fletcher, Field, and Massinger?). A fifth non-extant play, The Queen was questionably attributed to Fletcher by a contemporary.

The folios contain two works that are generally thought to be the work of Beaumont alone – The Knight of the Burning Pestle and The Masque of the Inner Temple and Gray's Inn – and fifteen that are solo efforts by Fletcher, and perhaps a dozen that are actual Beaumont/Fletcher collaborations. The rest are Fletcher's collaborations with Massinger and other writers.

Notes

- 1st Act – Year the play was first acted. Dates are approximate and, unless otherwise noted, follow Gurr.
- 1st Pub – Year of first publication as given by Glover & Waller, unless otherwise noted.
- Authorial attributions – Though there is general consensus, scholars still debate the exact contributions of authors. Unless otherwise noted, attributions are those of Cyrus Hoy.

Title	1st Act	1st Pub	1647	1679	Fletcher	Massinger	Beaumont	Other
The Mad Lover	1615-16	1647	1	12	x			
The Spanish Curate	1622	1647	2	7	x	x		
The Little French Lawyer	1619-23	1647	3	17	x	x		
The Custom of the Country	1620	1647	4	5	x	x		
The Noble Gentleman	1624-26	1647	5	40	x		x	
The Captain	1609-12	1647	6	26	x		x	
Beggars' Bush	1615-22	1647	7	9	x	x	x	
The Coxcomb	1608-09	1647	8	42	x		x	
The False One	1619-23	1647	9	16	x	x		
The Chances	1617	1647	10	20	x			
The Loyal Subject	1618	1647	11	13	x			
The Laws of Candy	1619-23	1647	12	15				Ford
The Lovers' Progress	1621-23	1647	13	24	x	x		
The Island Princess	1619-21	1647	14	39	x			
The Humorous Lieutenant	1619?	1647	15	10	x			
The Nice Valour	1621-24	1647	16	50				Middleton
The Maid in the Mill	1623	1647	17	33	x			Rowley
The Prophetess	1622	1647	18	27	x	x		
Bonduca	1611-14	1647	19	29	x			
The Sea Voyage	1622	1647	20	43	x	x		
The Double Marriage	1619-23	1647	21	32	x	x		
The Pilgrim	1621?	1647	22	25	x			
The Knight of Malta	1616-19	1647	23	34	x	x		Field
The Woman's Prize	1609-12	1647	24	38	x			
Love's Cure	1625	1647	25	35	x	x	x	
The Honest Man's Fortune	1612-15	1647	26	51	x	x		Field
The Queen of Corinth	1616-18	1647	27	28	x	x		Field
Women Pleased	1618-21	1647	28	36	x			
A Wife for a Month	1624	1647	29	23	x			
Wit at Several Weapons	1613	1647	30	44				Middleton, Rowley
Valentinian	1610-14	1647	31	18	x			
The Fair Maid of the Inn	1625	1647	32	45	x	x		Ford, Webster
Love's Pilgrimage	1612-15	1647	33	31	x		x	Jonson
The Masque of the Inner Temple and Gray's Inn	1612	1612?	34	52			x	
Four Plays, or Moral Representations, in One	1608	1647	35	53	x			Field
The Maid's Tragedy	1610	1619		1	x		x	
Philaster	1609	1620		2	x		x	
A King and No King	1611	1619		3	x		x	
The Scornful Lady	1612-15	1616		4	x		x	
The Elder Brother	1625?	1637		6	x	x		
Wit Without Money	1614	1639		8	x			Shirley, Unknown
The Faithful Shepherdess	1608	1609-10		11	x			
Rule a Wife and Have a Wife	1624	1640		14	x			
Monsieur Thomas	1612-15	1639		19	x			
Rollo, Duke of Normandy	1624-28	1639		21	x	x		Field, Chapman, Jonson
The Wild Goose Chase	1621?	1652		22	x			
The Knight of the Burning Pestle	1607	1613		30			x	
The Night Walker	1614	1640		37	x			Shirley
The Coronation	1635	1640		41				Shirley
Cupid's Revenge	1608	1615		46	x		x	
The Two Noble Kinsmen	1613?	1634		47	x			Shakespeare
Thierry and Theodoret	1613-21	1621		48	x	x	x	
The Woman Hater	1606	1607		49	x		x	
Henry VIII	1613	1623			x			Shakespeare
John van Olden Barnavelt	1619	1883			x	x		
A Very Woman	1634	1655			x	x		

== Later editions ==
The folios limited but did not extinguish the market for individual editions of the plays; such editions were printed when the chances for profit seemed favourable. Humphrey Robinson and Alice Moseley (Humphrey Moseley's widow) issued a quarto of Beggar's Bush in 1661, for example. During the Restoration era and into the 18th century, the plays in the Beaumont/Fletcher canon were very popular – though they were often performed in adapted versions rather than in the originals; and the adaptations then appeared in print. An adaptation of The Island Princess was published in 1669; and adapted version of Monsieur Thomas was printed in 1678. Beggar's Bush became The Royal Merchant, published in 1706 – and later, The Merchant of Bruges. This trend in favour of new adaptations over original versions made it easier for Herringman, Martyn, and Mariot to obtain permissions to reprint those originals in their 1679 collection.

== See also ==
- 1647 in literature

== Sources ==
- Bowers, Fredson, ed. (1966). The Dramatic Works in the Beaumont and Fletcher Canon. Vol. 1. Cambridge University Press.
- Bowers, Fredson, ed. (1996). The Dramatic Works in the Beaumont and Fletcher Canon. Vol. 10. Cambridge University Press. ISBN 0-521-36189-3.
- Glover, Arnold; Waller, A.R., eds. (1905–1912). The Works of Francis Beaumont and John Fletcher. Vol. 1–10. Cambridge University Press.
- Gurr, Andrew (1992). The Shakespearean Stage 1574-1642 (3rd ed.). Cambridge University Press. ISBN 978-0-521-42240-6.
- Gurr, Andrew (2004). The Shakespeare Company 1594-1642. Cambridge University Press. ISBN 978-0-521-17245-5.
- Hoy, Cyrus (1956). "The Shares of Fletcher and His Collaborators in the Beaumont and Fletcher Canon (I)". Studies in Bibliography. 8: 129–146.
- Hoy, Cyrus (1957). "The Shares of Fletcher and His Collaborators in the Beaumont and Fletcher Canon (II)". Studies in Bibliography. 9: 143–162.
- Hoy, Cyrus (1958). "The Shares of Fletcher and His Collaborators in the Beaumont and Fletcher Canon (III)". Studies in Bibliography. 11: 85–106.
- Hoy, Cyrus (1959). "The Shares of Fletcher and His Collaborators in the Beaumont and Fletcher Canon (IV)". Studies in Bibliography. 12: 91–116.
- Hoy, Cyrus (1960). "The Shares of Fletcher and His Collaborators in the Beaumont and Fletcher Canon (V)". Studies in Bibliography. 13: 77–108.
- Hoy, Cyrus (1961). "The Shares of Fletcher and His Collaborators in the Beaumont and Fletcher Canon (VI)". Studies in Bibliography. 14: 45–67.
- Hoy, Cyrus (1962). "The Shares of Fletcher and His Collaborators in the Beaumont and Fletcher Canon (VII)". Studies in Bibliography. 15: 71–90.
- Kinney, Arthur F., ed. (2002). A Companion to Renaissance Drama. London: Blackwell. ISBN 978-1405121798.
- Logan, Terence P.; Smith, Denzell S., eds. (1978). The Later Jacobean and Caroline Dramatists: A Survey and Bibliography of Recent Studies in English Renaissance Drama. Lincoln, NE: University of Nebraska Press. ISBN 978-0803228504.
- Maxwell, Baldwin (1939). Studies in Beaumont, Fletcher, and Massinger. Chapel Hill, NC: University of North Carolina Press.
- Oliphant, E. H. C. (1927). The Plays of Beaumont and Fletcher: An Attempt to Determine Their Respective Shares and the Shares of Others. New Haven: Yale University Press.
- Potter, Alfred Claghorn (1890). A Bibliography of Beaumont and Fletcher. Cambridge, MA: Library of Harvard University.
- Schelling, Felix E. (1908). Elizabethan Drama 1558-1642. Vol. 2. Boston: Houghton Mifflin Company.
- Sprague, Arthur Colby (1926). Beaumont and Fletcher on the Restoration Stage. Cambridge, MA: Harvard University Press.
- Taylor, Gary; Lavagnino, John; et al., eds. (2007). Thomas Middleton: The Collected Works. Oxford University Press. ISBN 978-0-19-818569-7.
- Taylor, Gary; Lavagnino, John; et al., eds. (2007). Thomas Middleton and Early Modern Textual Culture: A Companion to The Collected Works. Oxford University Press. ISBN 978-0-19-967873-0.
