= The Loyal Subject =

Stage play by John Fletcher

The Loyal Subject is a Jacobean era stage play, a tragicomedy by John Fletcher that was originally published in the first Beaumont and Fletcher folio of 1647.

== Performance ==
The play was acted by the King's Men; the cast list added to the text in the second Beaumont and Fletcher folio of 1679 cites Richard Burbage, Nathan Field, Henry Condell, John Underwood, John Lowin, Nicholas Tooley, Richard Sharpe, and William Ecclestone – which indicates a production in the 1616–19 era, between 1616, when Field joined the company, and Burbage's death in March 1619.

== Revival ==
The company revived the play in 1633, and performed it at the Palace of Whitehall on the night of Tuesday, 10 December of that year, before King Charles I and Queen Henrietta Maria. The play was entered into the Stationers' Register in 1633, which normally preceded a publication; but the play remained out of print until 1647.

Sir Henry Herbert, the Master of the Revels, left a note in his office book that is unusually informative on this play:

"The Kings players sent me an old booke of Fletchers called The Loyal Subject, formerly allowed by Sir George Bucke, 16 Novem. 1618, which according to their desire and agreement I did peruse and with some reservations allowed of, the 23 of Nov. 1633, for which they sent mee according to their promise £1.0.0."

Sir George Buck was Herbert's predecessor as Master of the Revels in the 1610–22 period. Critics have debated whether Herbert would have re-licensed an old play unless it had been changed or revised in the interim; some scholars have supposed that Fletcher's play must have been revised for the 1633 revival – though no clear evidence of revision is found in the text. The play's Prologue and Epilogue are thought to date from the 1633 production, and are perhaps the work of Fletcher's longtime collaborator Philip Massinger.

== Sources ==
Scholars have devoted significant attention to the question of Fletcher's sources for his play. Fletcher modeled his play on an earlier work by Thomas Heywood titled The Royal King and the Loyal Subject, first published in 1637 but written two or three decades earlier. He also used a play by Lope de Vega called El gran duque de Moscovia, written c. 1613. An extensive study of the relationship between the plays of Fletcher and Lope de Vega and their background in Russian history has been published by Ervin Brody. The setting may also have been inspired by his uncle Giles Fletcher the elder's treatise Of the Russe Commonwealth, published 1591 after the author's diplomatic work in Russia.

== In the Restoration ==
The play was both revived and adapted after the London theatres re-opened with the Restoration (1660), as were many of Fletcher's plays. On 18 August 1660, Samuel Pepys saw a production that featured Edward Kynaston, the last of the famous boy actors of the century, in the role of the Duke's sister. (Pepys thought that Kynaston "made the loveliest lady that ever I saw in my life, only her voice not very good.") The Loyal Subject was one of the first dramas staged by Thomas Betterton, and was one of his earliest successes. Fletcher's play was adapted into a version titled The Faithful General by a woman who identified herself as M. N.; among other changes, she shifted the setting from Russia to Byzantium. Her version was acted and printed in 1706. Thomas Sheridan made a prose adaptation that was staged in Dublin.

== Synopsis ==
The play is set in Muscovy, which is ruled by an otherwise-unnamed Duke of Moscow. The Duke is served by Archas, a capable and loyal general; but the Duke dismisses Archas from his post, because Archas once corrected the Duke's mistakes in a military exercise. When a Tartar invasion is imminent, however, the Duke must recall Archas, since the army refuses to fight without their commander. The evil counsellor Boroskie tells the Duke that Archas conceals a secret treasure, which was given to him by the Duke's father for safe keeping; Archas was to give it to the present Duke in time of need. The Duke takes possession of the treasure, and orders Archas to send his two daughters to Court. (One of the daughters, a supposed innocent, nonetheless manages to outwit and outmaneuver the dissipated Duke before he can seduce her; they end up married.)

Based on Boroskie's false charges, Archas is arrested and tortured on suspicions that he aims at the throne. The general's son Theodor storms the royal palace and frees his father; the Duke repents, apologizes to Archas, and punishes Boroskie. The Duke's soldiers rebel, and are so disaffected that they intend to join the Tartars to overthrow their Duke; but the loyal Archas prevents them, and is even prepared to execute his son Theodor for treason before the Duke intervenes. It is revealed that Archas's younger son has been living in disguise for his own safety, as Alinda, a servant of the Duke's sister.

The idea of an extreme test of a subject's loyalty under outrageous royal misbehavior is one that Fletcher employs in other plays, including The Maid's Tragedy and Valentinian.

Critics have studied Fletcher's as a socio-political commentary on his own culture: the Muscovy of the play is a version of the England of King James I.
