= A Wife for a Month =

Stage play by John Fletcher

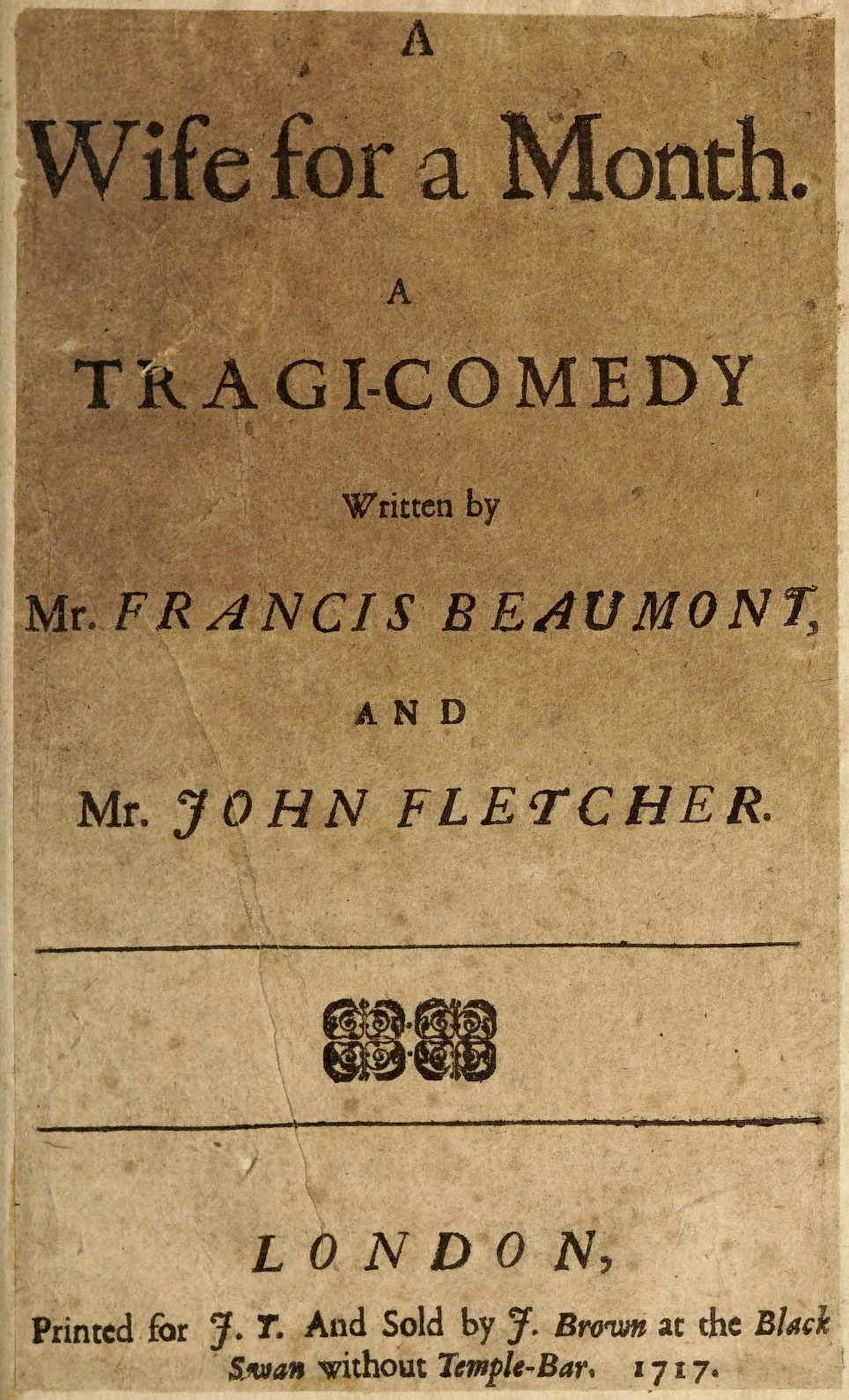
Title page of the 1717 edition of A Wife for a Month

A Wife for a Month is a late Jacobean era stage play, a tragicomedy written by John Fletcher and originally published in the first Beaumont and Fletcher folio of 1647.

The play was licensed for performance by Sir Henry Herbert, the Master of the Revels, on 27 May 1624; it was acted by the King's Men. The partial cast list added to the play in the second Beaumont and Fletcher folio of 1679 mentions Joseph Taylor, Robert Benfield, Richard Robinson, John Underwood, Nicholas Tooley, and George Birch. The list contains a contradiction, since Tooley died in June 1623 and could not have been cast in a 1624 production. Commentators have suggested this Tooley's name may be a mistake for that of John Lowin, or else that Fletcher may have drawn up the cast list when he was writing the play; the cast list would therefore reflect the author's intention rather than the onstage reality. Since Fletcher functioned as a house dramatist for the King's Men in the final phase of his career, this idea, while speculative, is not impossible. Fletcher's solo authorship of the play is undisputed.

A Wife for a Month was revived during the Restoration era, with Thomas Betterton in the cast, but it does not seem to have ever been popular. Samuel Pepys mentions it in his famous Diary, in his entry for 19 December 1662, though he merely notes having read the play, not having seen it on the stage. It was reprinted in a single-play edition in 1717. The play was also adapted during the period, as were many of Fletcher's plays; a version by Thomas Scott titled The Unhappy Kindness, or A Fruitless Revenge was acted at Drury Lane in 1697.

Critics have often responded negatively to the drama, calling it Fletcher's "lewdest" play, and complaining of its "oppressiveness" and its celebration of a "macabre marriage".

The play's plot turns on the idea of a tyrannical king who allows a man to marry the woman he loves, yet for only a month, and without pursuing sexual relations, on pain of her execution if he violates the rule. At the end of that month, he will be executed.

== Plot ==
A Wife for a Month centers on Evanthe, a beautiful and chaste lady-in-waiting to Frederick's Queen. Evanthe has never been married, and King Frederick lusts after her. In the first scene, he calls for her to be brought before him, and her cruel brother Sorano does not object. Upon meeting Evanthe, Frederick proposes to sleep with her. She is appalled, and refuses. Her brother pushes her to accept the King's generous offer, telling her what an honour it is that he wants her; she is horrified, especially after being offered riches, fine clothes and money to sleep with the King and be his mistress. The King then decides that he will force Evanthe to marry another man, the valiant Valerio. She agrees, viewing marriage as much nobler than being a mistress to a married man, but then the King orders that Valerio be killed within the month, and sentences Evanthe to a series of marriages that will all end in her husbands' deaths after each month passes. The Queen is horrified: marriage ought to be holy, and all agree that the King is interfering with divine ordinance in disregarding and disrespecting marriage.

Once Evanthe and Valerio are married, they decide to make the best of it, and to love each other. They plan to consummate the marriage, but Sorano comes secretly to Valerio with the King's order that if he lies with his wife, she will face immediate death. He is not to tell her of his bind. King Frederick's aim is to ruin their marriage, have Evanthe resent Valerio, and then run to his own arms. He believes that if he can come between the couple, Evanthe will fall in love with him.

Meanwhile, Cassandra, Evanthe's waiting woman, tries to convince her to lie with Frederick (Frederick has put her up to this, but she's to pretend she believes it's acceptable). Try as she might to compel Evanthe to lie with the 'Herculean warrior king' she makes him out to be, Evanthe refuses. Evanthe openly defies Frederick, and pledges her loyalty to Valerio. Frederick orders Valerio's death. He believes it's been carried out, and his body thrown into the sea, but Valerio actually remains alive. Frederick orders Evanthe to be remarried to another man for a month. Her suitors, including a Lawyer, Physician, Fool, Captain, and a Cutpurse all leave upon learning they will be executed. Valerio, disguised as the princely Urbino, arrives as a last "hope" for marrying her. He agrees to the match knowing he is to die in a month.

Rebels surround the castle, and the men all turn on Frederick and Sorano, his lone supporter. Valerio reveals himself, and the commons all cheer for Prince Alfonso as the new King. Alfonso sentences Sorano and Frederick not to death, but to monastic lives of fasting, prayer, and pilgrimage to their dead father the former king's grave. Order is restored to the kingdom, and Alfonso calls for all to "forget old paines and injuries... / and drown all in fair health."
