= Four Plays in One =

Stage play in the canon of John Fletcher

Four Plays, or Moral Representations, in One is a Jacobean era stage play, one of the dramatic works in the canon of John Fletcher and his collaborators. Initially published in the first Beaumont and Fletcher folio of 1647, the play is notable both for its unusual form and for the question of its authorship.

== History ==
No firm information of the date of Four Plays in One is available in the historical record. On general considerations, scholars have provisionally dated the play to the 1608–13 period. Of the four playlets, the last, The Triumph of Time, is the most masque-like, even to the point of featuring an anti-masque. Since Ben Jonson effectively invented the anti-masque in The Masque of Queens, which was performed and published early in 1609, it seems unlikely that Four Plays in One could be earlier than that.

== Composition ==
As its title indicates, Four Plays in One is composed of a quartet of short plays; it takes the form of an Induction that sets up a frame play, followed by four plays-within-a-play, titled The Triumph of Honor, The Triumph of Love, The Triumph of Death, and The Triumph of Time. These dramatic techniques were rare but not unknown in Fletcher's time. The Induction and frame-play structure can be found in several works, including the anonymous The Taming of A Shrew and Shakespeare's The Taming of the Shrew, both from the early 1590s, and Francis Beaumont's The Knight of the Burning Pestle of 1607, among other examples. And the idea of a group of short plays presented as a unit can be traced back to Three Plays in One and Five Plays in One (both 1585) and an earlier Four Plays in One (1591); the two-part play The Seven Deadly Sins (c. 1585) shared the same type of structure; and a quartet titled All's One was acted c. 1606. (Unfortunately almost all of these are lost plays. Only one of the short plays in All's One has survived, as A Yorkshire Tragedy.)

== Authorship ==
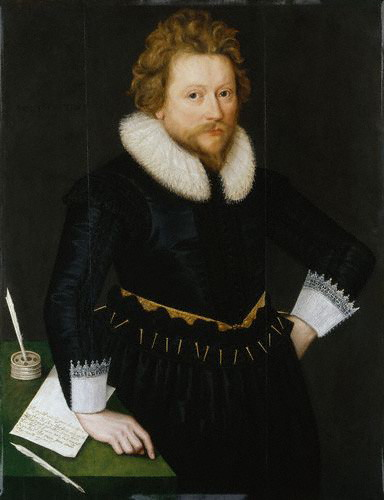
Portrait of John Fletcher

Scholars have considered it obvious that the play is a work of composite authorship: Fletcher's highly distinctive and easily recognizable style is clearly present in the final two "triumphs" of the quartet, and just as clearly absent from the first half of the work as a whole. Traditional critics assumed that Francis Beaumont was the author of the first two "triumphs" — until E. H. C. Oliphant introduced the hypothesis that Nathan Field was involved in the work's creation. This idea met initial resistance but won greater acceptance over a generation or two; after Cyrus Hoy's work of the Fletcher canon, the scholarly consensus has solidified in the view that Four Plays in One is a Field/Fletcher collaboration, in which Field wrote the Induction, The Triumph of Honor, and The Triumph of Love, while Fletcher wrote The Triumph of Death and The Triumph of Time.

Aspects of Four Plays in One, especially its richness in music, song, and dance and its highly coloured and variegated elements, have suggested to scholars that the play may have been performed by one of the companies of boy actors of its era. If this is valid, the company in question was probably the Children of the Queen's Revels. (The Children of Paul's ceased dramatic performances in 1606, while the King's Revels Children were a relatively transitory presence.) Since Field was acting with The Queen's Revels Children in the 1608–13 period, these conjoined hypotheses of author, date, and company are mutually supportive.

== Influences ==
The two authors depended on a variety of earlier works and writers for source material and precedents, including the Trionfi of Petrarch, the novels of Giovanni Boccaccio and Matteo Bandello (sometimes through English translations and adaptations, as in The Palace of Pleasure by William Painter), and "The Franklin's Tale" in The Canterbury Tales of Geoffrey Chaucer.

The four "triumphs" in Four Plays in One show a strong influence from the morality plays of the later Middle Ages, combined with influences from the Jacobean masque and the pageants and processions that were an important part of public life in Jacobean England. This combination of influences from morality play and masque makes Four Plays in One a highly unusual work for its era; for a rare similar work, consider the "moral masque" The Sun's Darling in the next generation (1625). The "triumphs" in Four Plays in One are rich in processions, dumbshows, music, and "special effects."

== Synopsis ==
The Induction
The Induction is set at the royal court of Lisbon during the 1497 wedding festivities of Manuel I of Portugal (The text calls him "Emanuel") and Isabella of Aragon, Princess of Asturias (the play misidentifies her as "Isabella of Castile"). The conceit of the play is that the four "triumphs" are presented before the royal nuptial couple and their assembled courtiers.

The king and queen are treated with the very elaborate courtly flattery of the time, praised as "gracious and excellent," "virtuous and beautiful," joined in a union that will produce "millions of prosperous seeds," etc. The dramatists' choice of this particular couple may seem odd at first, since Isabella died in childbirth after only a year of marriage – but Death is one of the four elements of the play.

The Triumph of Honor
The first short play portrays the Roman general Martius after his victory over Sophocles, the ruler of Athens. In defeat, the unbowed will of Sophocles and the grace of his wife Dorigen earn the respect and magnanimity of their Roman conquerors. Their honour is contrasted with the dishonorable and contemptible conduct of Nicodemus, "a cowardly Corporal," and his compatriots.

(The sources are novel 5 of Day 10 in the Decameron of Boccaccio, and Chaucer's Franklin's Tale.)

The Triumph of Love
The second "triumph" is set in Milan, and concerns the Duke and his family – his wife, his sons Gerard and Ferdinand, and Gerard's mistress Violante. A conflict of generations and classes is resolved through two mock deaths and resurrections. Cupid influences the family's recovery from its troubles.

(The source is also from Boccaccio's Decameron, novel 8 of day 5.)

The Triumph of Death
The third playlet treats the fate of Lavall, the "lustful Heir" of the Duke of Anjou. Lavall has put aside his first wife Gabriella to tale a second, Hellena. He encounters a spirit that reproves him for his various sins. Lavall dies miserable and unforgiven.

(The source is Painter's Palace of Pleasure, novella 42 of book 1.)

The Triumph of Time
The final section features classical deities and anthropomorphic personifications typical of the masque form: Jupiter, Mercury, Time, Desire, Vain Delight, Fames, Poverty, and others. It includes an anti-masque of "Plutus, with a troop of Indians, singing and dancing wildly about him...." The point of the playlet is that humanity, or Antropos, can employ "Industry and the Arts" of human culture to transcend the limitations of death.

(No specific source has been identified; this appears to have been the authors' invention.)

Emanuel and Isabella comment on the "triumphs" at their conclusions. Emanuel returns briefly at the end of the piece to complete the frame play.

== Sources ==
- Chambers, E. K. The Elizabethan Stage. 4 Volumes, Oxford, Clarendon Press, 1923.
- Hoy, Cyrus. "The Shares of Fletcher and His Collaborators in the Beaumont and Fletcher Canon" (IV). Studies in Bibliography 12 (1959), pp. 91–116.
- Logan, Terence P., and Denzell S. Smith, eds. The Later Jacobean and Caroline Dramatists: A Survey and Bibliography of Recent Studies in English Renaissance Drama. Lincoln, NE, University of Nebraska Press, 1978.
- Oliphant, E. H. C. The Plays of Beaumont and Fletcher: An Attempt to Determine Their Respective Shares and the Shares of Others. New Haven, Yale University Press, 1927.
