= The Knight of Malta =

Jacobean era stage play

The Knight of Malta is a Jacobean era stage play, a tragicomedy in the canon of John Fletcher and his collaborators. It was initially published in the first Beaumont and Fletcher folio of 1647. Modern scholarship attributes the play to the joint authorship of Fletcher, Philip Massinger and Nathan Field, and dates the play's composition and first performance to the period of 1616–1619.

== Date and source ==
No firm information is available on the play's date of authorship or earliest stage production. The cast list for the original King's Men's production, added in the second Beaumont and Fletcher folio of 1679, cites Richard Burbage, Henry Condell, Nathan Field, Robert Benfield, John Underwood, John Lowin, Richard Sharpe, and Thomas Holcombe, indicating that the play was performed in the 1616–1619 period – after Field joined the troupe in 1616 but before Burbage's death in March 1619. Because it is unlikely Field would have written for the King's Men while he was still a member of the Lady Elizabeth's Men, it is likely the play was composed in the period 1616–1619.

The authors depended upon the Filocolo of Giovanni Boccaccio as their source for the plot, specifically the section of that work called "The Thirteen Questions of Love." For details about the Knights of Malta, they relied on François Belleforest's Cosmographie Universelle and Richard Knolles's Generall Historie of the Turkes.

== Authorship ==
Scholars, from F. G. Fleay to Cyrus Hoy and after, have attributed the authorship of the play to Fletcher, Field, and Philip Massinger. While not unanimous on all points, critics have generally favoured a division of authorship along these lines:

Field — Acts I and V;
Fletcher — Act II;
Fletcher and Massinger — Acts III and IV.

The play was roughly contemporaneous with The Queen of Corinth, another work by the same trio of writers.

The play contains numerous stage directions which are theatrical in nature; this, together with the good state of the folio text, indicates that the play was printed from a prompt book. However, discrepancies in the names of major characters (as, for instance, the play's villainess, called Zanthia in Act I and Abdella in Acts II–V) indicate that none of the authors worked over the contributions of the three playwrights before turning it over to the playhouse.

== Politics ==
In the period in which the play was written, King James I was pursuing a policy of Spanish appeasement; the play's choice of subject, the Knights of Malta, has been interpreted in light of that policy, as a gesture at royal flattery. Modern critics have focused on the play's Christian/Muslim conflict, its sexual politics, and the racial implications of making the play's villain an African woman.

== Characters ==
- Valetta – Grand Master of Malta
- Miranda – An Italian gentleman, later The Knight of Malta
- Astorius – A knight of the Order
- Castriot – A knight of Order
- Mountferrat – A knight of Order, the play's major villain
- Peter Gomera – A Spanish gentleman, and candidate for membership in the Order
- Norandine – A Danish captain, commander of the galleys of Malta
- Collonna (later called Angelo) – A captive redeemed from the Turkish Gallies
- Rocca – Servant to Mountferrat
- Oriana – Valetta's sister, beloved of Miranda, Gomera, and Mountferrat
- Velleda – Oriana's attendant
- Abdella (called Zanthia in Act I) – A Moorish servant to Oriana
- Lucinda – A beautiful Turkish captive
- Prisoners, soldiers, servants, two marshals, two bishops, two gentlewomen, two watchmenn, a corporal, a doctor, a sailor, a member of the Esguard (a Maltese military tribunal)

== Synopsis ==
The play is set on Malta, in the era when the Knights of Malta used that island as their base in their conflict with the Ottoman Empire. The action opens with a soliloquy by the play's villain, Mountferrat, a French member of the Order. Mountferrat, one of the Order's most formidable warriors, has reached a point in his life when he is no longer willing or able to adhere to his monastic vows. He maintains a sexual relationship with an African serving woman, Zanthia; more recklessly, he has also been propositioning Oriana, sister to Valletta, the Grand Master of the Order. Oriana has spurned his overtures, though she has kept them secret to avoid a scandal that would damage the Order's reputation. Zanthia, a longtime servant of Oriana, has learned to imitate her mistress's handwriting, in a plan to use that skill against Oriana.

Mountferrat has also grown resentful of the newer members of the Order who are receiving the kind of attention that he enjoyed in the past. Two prominent probationers, Miranda and Gomera, are being honoured for their victories; each is given the opportunity to accept promotion from "Squire at Arms" to full membership as a Knight of the Order. Both, however, refuse; Miranda, the younger man, hesitates to take the monastic vows due to qualms of conscience. Gomera, an older man, confesses that he is in love, and therefore not prepared to take the vow of chastity. He admits that he loves Oriana, and Valletta and other knights approve of the potential match. Mountferrat interrupts this scene to present Zanthia's forged letter. Oriana has received a marriage proposal from the Basha of Tripoli, though she has no intention of accepting the Muslim ruler's proposal. Zanthia's forged letter indicates that Oriana will marry the Basha and will betray the Knights in the process.

Gomera rejects this slander, stating that Mountferrat is known to have pursued Oriana himself; he insists in defending Oriana in a trial by combat. Meanwhile, Miranda is engaged in warfare with the Turks; in the process, a beautiful young woman named Lucinda has come into his custody. Miranda subjects her to the kind of "chastity tests" that are such a noteworthy feature of Fletcherian drama; she passes all of them, consistently resisting his advances. Miranda had also been an admirer of Oriana; when he learns about the scandal and the coming combat between Mountferrat and Gomera, he goes to see Mountferrat. The villain plays upon Miranda's ego, suggesting that Gomera has dismissed him as a "boy." Miranda pleads to be allowed to take Mountferrat's place in the combat, and Mountferrat cynically agrees.

The combat is held; Gomera wins. Miranda's participation is not revealed until the duel is over, and the visor of his helmet is lifted. Miranda claims to have saved Miranda's honour, suggesting that he threw the combat deliberately; the implication is that Mountferrat would most likely have killed Gomera if the two had fought ("Gomera's old and stiff"). Both men appeal for Oriana's hand. Valletta decides that Gomera will marry Oriana, while Miranda becomes a knight of the Order. Mountferrat is sought as a criminal, and goes into hiding.

Gomera and Oriana settle into married life, and Oriana becomes pregnant. Zanthia/Abdella serves Oriana, and tries to provoke Gomera's jealousy over Oriana's admiration of Miranda. (The servant helps Mountferrat in his plan to seduce Oriana, because Mountferrat has promised to marry her.) In a confrontation between husband and wife, Oriana faints, and Abdella administers a sleeping potion that mimics death. Oriana is believed dead, and her body is taken to a crypt in a church. What follows borrows heavily from the climax of Romeo and Juliet. Mountferrat and Abdella intend to go to the church and abduct Oriana when she wakes; but Miranda and his friend Norandine come to the church first. Miranda is there to pray after his most recent chastity test of Lucinda. The two men find Oriana as she awakens, and rescue her, leaving the church with her. Mountferrat and Abdella arrive soon after, only to find that Oriana is already gone. Gomera also arrives, mourning his wife; he finds and challenges Mountferrat.

The group leaves the church to fight in the open. Both Mountferrat and his servant attack Gomera with their swords, but are unable to defeat him; Abdella decides to resolve the combat with a pistol. Her shot wounds Gomera in the arm—but the report of the pistol attracts the attention of Norandine, which leads to the apprehension of Mountferrat and Abdella. In Miranda's care, Oriana gives birth to a son. In the play's denouement, Oriana and her son are re-united with Gomera, as Lucinda is with the man who was her intended husband prior to her capture. Mountferrat is stripped of his membership in the Order, while Miranda is promoted to full membership, thus becoming the Knight of Malta of the title.

The play's comic relief is provided by the character Norandine, a Danish probationer who is a bluff, lusty, passionate character. Norandine's banter with his compatriots, with his surgeon, with soldiers and servants, supplies diversions of levity. Like Gomera, Norandine also refuses full knighthood; he likes drink and women too much to accept the monastic vows.
