= The Woman Hater =

17th-century comedy by Beaumont and Fletcher

The Woman Hater, or, The Hungry Courtier is an early Jacobean era stage play, a comedy by Francis Beaumont and John Fletcher. One of the earliest of their collaborations, it was the first of their plays to appear in print, in 1607.

== Date and publication ==
The play was entered into the Stationers' Register on 20 May 1607, and was published later that year in quarto by the bookseller John Hodgets. A second imprint of the first quarto was issued in the same year. The title page offers no assignment of authorship. A few critics have suggested a 1605 date for the play, but most favor a date of 1606.

A second quarto was issued in 1648 by Humphrey Moseley, with an attribution to Fletcher. The second imprint of this second quarto, issued in 1649, assigned the play to both Beaumont and Fletcher and added a subtitle to the play, calling it The Woman Hater, or The Hungry Courtier.

Like other previously published plays, The Woman Hater was omitted from the first Beaumont and Fletcher folio of 1647. The play was later included in the second Beaumont/Fletcher folio in 1679.

The song "Come, Sleep" from Act III has been anthologized under the title "Sleep" and often set to music by later composers.

== Performance ==
The title page of the first quarto states that the play was acted by the Children of Paul's, a company of child actors that is thought to have ceased activity after the summer of 1606.

== Authorship ==
The consensus of critical judgement accepts the play as a Beaumont and Fletcher collaboration in which Beaumont's is the dominant hand. Cyrus Hoy, in his survey of authorship problems in the canon of Fletcher and his collaborators, provided this breakdown of the two authors' respective shares:

Beaumont – Act I; Act II; Act III, scenes 2-4; Act IV, 1; Act V, 1, 3, and 4;
Beaumont and Fletcher – Act III, scene 1; Act IV, 2 and 3; Act V, 2 and 5.

Fletcher revised five scenes in Beaumont's play, scenes that deal with the chastity test. This dramaturgic element was a preoccupation with Fletcher, and recurs in his plays with Beaumont and other collaborators and his solo works as well. Other critics have agreed in substance, though not in all particulars, with Hoy's division.

== Characters ==
The Duke of Milan

Arrigo and Lucio - his courtiers.

Valore - a count, and brother to Oriana.

Gondarino - a general, the woman hater.

Lazarillo - a courtier and gourmand

Oriana - Valore's sister

Julia - a prostitute

Mercer

Panderer

== Synopsis ==
The Duke of Milan cannot sleep. As he walks with his courtiers, Arrigo and Lucio, he explains that the cause of his insomnia is not some heavy matter of state, or the welfare of his people, but a woman. This particular woman is Oriana, sister to Count Valore, whom the Duke has seen but never spoken to; yet is so enticing to the Duke that he laments he would give up his rule for her and kneel at her feet. That same evening, a very special fish has come to Milan. Specifically, the head of an umbrannes fish delivered to the Duke of Milan and passed on to his friend, the general Gondarino. This rare delicacy has attracted the attention of the courtier Lazarillo, a gourmand who spends his days hunting down the best dishes in Milan and securing invitations to events where they are served.

Meanwhile, Valore is at odds with his sister, determined to shield her from the corrupting influence of court. Though a mere fifteen years old, Oriana is determined to experience all the outside world has to offer, and against her brother's wishes, sets out to court. Though distressed by his sister's actions, Valore is glad at the approach of Lazarillo, hoping the gourmand will provide him some distraction.

There is none to be had though, as Lazarillo, determined in his quest for the umbrannes, refuses Valore's request to dine with him, instead pleading the Count to present him to the Duke, in hopes of wrangling an invitation to the Duke's dinner. Valore acquiesces, but for his own amusement orders his spies to accompany Lazarillo, in the off chance the gourmand make some sort of treasonous comment. While Lazarillo has been busy soliciting an introduction from Valore, his boy has discovered that the umbrannes is no longer in the Duke's possession, but has been sent to the general Gondarino. Agreeing to meet Valore later, Lazarillo heads off in pursuit of an invitation to the general's dinner.

Unfortunately for Lazarillo, the umbrannes is no longer in the general's possession. When first presented with the fish head, Gondarino assumes it is sent by a woman. He, therefore, refuses it, as he believes that all women are "whores." When his servant informs him that the umbrannes is, in fact, a gift from the Duke, Gondarino has it sent to his mercer, as remuneration for a previous unpaid shipment of silks. In truth, Gondarino barely pays the delicacy any notice, as he is preoccupied with bemoaning the degenerate nature of women. As if on cue, Oriana arrives at his door, seeking shelter from a sudden hailstorm. Though denied sanctuary by Gondarino on account of her sex, the obstinate Oriana barges in any way. Though the general flings insults at her, Oriana responds with nothing but pleasantries; that is, up until the point that she informs Gondarino that she sought out his house specifically because of his reputation as a woman hater, hoping to amuse herself by aggravating him.

Suddenly, the Duke and his two courtiers, having also been caught in the streets by the hailstorm, appear at Gondarino's door. While Gondarino rails against the presence of a woman in his house, the Duke begins to suspect his protests are a ruse designed to conceal an illicit love affair with his beloved Oriana. As he shares his suspicions with Lucio, Valore and Lazarillo appear, the latter still on the hunt for the umbrannes head. Valore, as promised, provides Lazarillo with an introduction to the Duke, who receives him warmly and extends an invitation to dinner, which Lazarillo, not to be distracted from his quest, denies. Upon hearing his prize is no longer in Gondarino's possession, he sets out after it with Valore in tow. Oriana, determined to torment Gondarino "into madness," insists on dining with him, resolved that "the more he hates, the more I'll seem to love."

Oriana uses every tool at her disposal to convince Gondarino of her love, up to and including serenading him. Later, the Duke questions Gondarino as to the nature of his relationship with the girl. Sensing his chance to avenge himself, Gondarino slanders Oriana by not only confirming the Duke's suspicions but by denouncing her as an "arrant whore." Anguished and disbelieving, the Duke rushes out. Oriana enters, and Gondarino, feigning love for her, confesses his slanders. He then vows to repair the damage he has done and requests Oriana retire to his country house while he does so. Beguiled by his seeming honesty, Oriana agrees, unaware that Gondarino has sent her to a brothel.

As Lazarillo heads to the mercer's house, Valore's spies met with Lucio, having cobbled together enough random snatches of Lazarillo's statements as to manufacture the appearance of treason. Lazarillo arrives at the mercer's house too late, as the mercer has already traded the fish to a panderer in exchange for a bride. Learning this, Lazarillo sets out to the panderer's brothel, the same location to which Oriana has been sent.

At court, Valore defends his sister to the Duke while Gondarino stands by his lies. To settle the issue, Gondarino proposes to take the Duke and Valore to see her transgressions with their own eyes. Thus they set out for the panderer's brothel. Also en route is the mercer, looking for his promised bride, and Lazarillo, hunting down his prized fish. The mercer arrives first and enters the brothel. Following him is Lazarillo, who secures an invitation to dinner from Julia, a prostitute. He enters the brothel but is promptly arrested for treason by Valore's spies before he can eat. As he is dragged away, he vows to marry Julia if she will only save the fish until he returns. When the Duke, Gondarino, and Valore arrive, they see Oriana at the brothel, and the Duke is convinced of her crimes.

Back at court, the Duke, Gondarino, and Valore argue over Oriana's fate. It is decided that her virtue will be put to the test, her life forfeit should she fail. While the three noblemen secretly watch, Arrigo comes to Oriana with a proposition. He tells her that, as punishment for her transgression, it has been decided that she will be put to death. He goes on to say that the only way she might avoid execution is through Arrigo's intervention, which comes at a price: she must sleep with him. Oriana refuses, and in doing so proves her virtue. The Duke reveals himself and claims Oriana as his bride. As punishment, Gondarino is bound to a chair and is made to suffer as Oriana directs the ladies of the court to fondle him. Lazarillo is pardoned by Valore and immediately sets out to the brothel. He keeps his vow, marries Julia, and finally gets to feast on the umbrannes.

== Psychology ==
Critics have commented on the play's curious juxtaposition of two unrelated portrayals of obsessive psychology. In the main plot, Gondarino is a dedicated misogynist who strives to avoid any and all contact with women. The primary subplot traces Lazarello's obsessive quest for, of all things, a really nice piece of fish. "Beaumont juggles four plots with considerable ease, offering a bit of something for everyone: farce, bawdy wit, court satire, and a 'high' romantic plot."

== Language ==
This play has the earliest attested usage of a number of words and phrases in the Oxford English Dictionary, including:

- 'earshot'
- 'prostitute'
- 'worm' and 'worming' to mean 'spying'
- the figurative use of 'yelping'

== See also ==
- Swetnam the Woman-Hater
