= Love's Cure =

1647 stage play, partly by John Fletcher

Love's Cure, or The Martial Maid is an early seventeenth-century stage play, a comedy in the canon of John Fletcher and his collaborators. First published in the Beaumont and Fletcher folio of 1647, it is the subject of broad dispute and uncertainty among scholars. In the words of Gerald Eades Bentley, "nearly everything about the play is in a state of confusion...."

== Authorship ==
Early critics assigned the authorship of the play to Beaumont and Fletcher, Philip Massinger, Thomas Middleton, William Rowley, Thomas Dekker, John Webster, James Shirley, and even Ben Jonson, in diverse combinations. The most common view is that the play is a work originally by Fletcher and Francis Beaumont, later revised by Massinger. (The play's Prologue mentions Beaumont and Fletcher by name, while the Epilogue refers to a single author, probably meaning the reviser.) Massinger's revision was sweeping, covering most of Acts I, IV, and V. Cyrus Hoy, in his survey of authorship problems in Fletcher's canon, produced a detailed breakdown of authorship shares among scenes, portions of scenes, and single speeches. Hoy said the authors were:

Massinger – Act I, scenes 1 and 3; Act IV, 1, 2, and 4; Act V, 1 and 2;
Beaumont – Act III, scene 1;
Fletcher – Act III, scene 5;
Fletcher and Massinger – Act I, scene 2; Act III, 2 and 4; Act IV, 3;
Beaumont and Fletcher – Act II, scene 1; Act III, 3;
Beaumont, Fletcher, and Massinger – Act II, scene 2; Act V, 3.

== Date ==
The date of the play is equally in dispute. Most scholars favour an estimate of c. 1612–15, though a date as early as 1606 has been proposed. A crucial source for the sole existing text has been identified as La fuerza de la costumbre (1625) by Guillén de Castro y Bellvis – though this could have been the source for Massinger's revision only, which must have been executed after that date. The play's early performance history is unknown; it had passed into the possession of the King's Men by 1641. Massinger, who served as a house dramatist for the King's Men through the mature phase of his career in the 1630s, may have done his revision of the play for a revival by that company, as he did for other Fletcher plays.

== Synopsis ==
Set in Seville, the play concerns a feud between the houses of two Spanish aristocrats, Don Pedro de Vitelli and Don Ferdinando de Alvarez. Twenty years earlier, Alvarez had killed Vitelli's uncle in a duel, and had fled Spain with his small son Lucio, leaving behind his wife Eugenia and daughter "Posthumia." In the play's opening scene, Vitelli reveals that Alvarez has been pardoned by King Philip and is returning to the city. Serving during the Siege of Ostend, Alvarez's son Lucio distinguished himself for bravery, and as his reward begged his father's pardon. Vitelli, however, is determined to fulfill the demands of his code of honour and obtain revenge for his uncle's death.

Alvarez's family situation reveals surprising complexities. Conversations between Alvarez and his "son" "Lucio," and between "daughter" "Posthumia" and the family servant Bobadilla, disclose two masquerades: the "Lucio" who won his father's pardon in battle is actually Alvarez's daughter Clara, who has been raised as a boy and has developed into a formidable warrior; and "Posthumia" is the real Lucio. Eugenia, left behind by her husband, concealed Lucio's gender to protect him from the vengeance of "Vitelli and his faction," and raised the boy as a girl. Now that the disguises are no longer necessary, the parents expect their children to accept their "natural" and socially appropriate roles as male and female; but both Lucio and Clara resist the change and cling to their long-familiar gender guises.

Clara cannot resist her combative instincts; when a street brawl breaks out between the Vitelli and Alvarez factions, she draws a sword and plunges in. Yet when she sees Vitelli fighting bravely, alone against her father and a follower, she so admires his courage that she fights on his side and saves him. The two are instantly attracted to each other. The situation is complicated, though, when Clara learns that Vitelli maintains a sexual relationship with the courtesan Malroda. The courtesan exploits Vitelli for gold and jewels, but is enamored of a man named Piorato – who, jealous of the nobleman, exposes Vitelli's affair to Clara. She is distressed by the knowledge – yet when Vitelli is set upon by Piorato and his followers, Clara grabs a sword and saves Vitelli again. The two come to an understanding: once Vitelli sees that he must give up sexual license, and once Clara is ready to sacrifice her masculine behaviours, they can agree to become husband and wife.

Alvarez tries several approaches to make his son Lucio more masculine, but without much success; he grows increasingly desperate and exasperated. In another street fight, elements of both factions are set upon by a gang of would-be thieves; Lucio finally fights when he sees his father in danger. He also meets Vitelli's sister Genevora, and the two of them quickly fall in love.

The King of Spain, tired of the long-running feud and civil strife, issues a proclamation allowing Vitelli and Alvarez to resolve their difference through a trial by combat. When the time for the combat comes, the intended duellists are interrupted by Clara, Genevora, and Eugenia, who plead for a peaceful resolution. The combatants are obdurate; but when the three women arm themselves with swords and a pistol and threaten to fight too, the men finally accept a peaceful compact. With the feud pacified, Vitelli and Clara, and Lucio and Genevora, are free to marry.

The play supplies abundant comic material through the corrupt constable Alguazeir and his group of tradesmen, who plan to become thieves but without the competence needed for success. Verbal fireworks between Malroda and Piorato, and Bobadilla and various characters, also contribute.

Love's Cure is one of the mere dozen plays in the Fletcher canon that were not revived in the Restoration era – somewhat surprisingly, since the play exploits the titillation factor of gender cross-dressing. It was, however, reprinted in a single-play quarto edition in 1718.

== Critical responses ==
The play's strong theme of gender and sexuality has attracted modern commentators on the subject.
