= The Fatal Dowry =

Play by Philip Massinger and Nathan Field

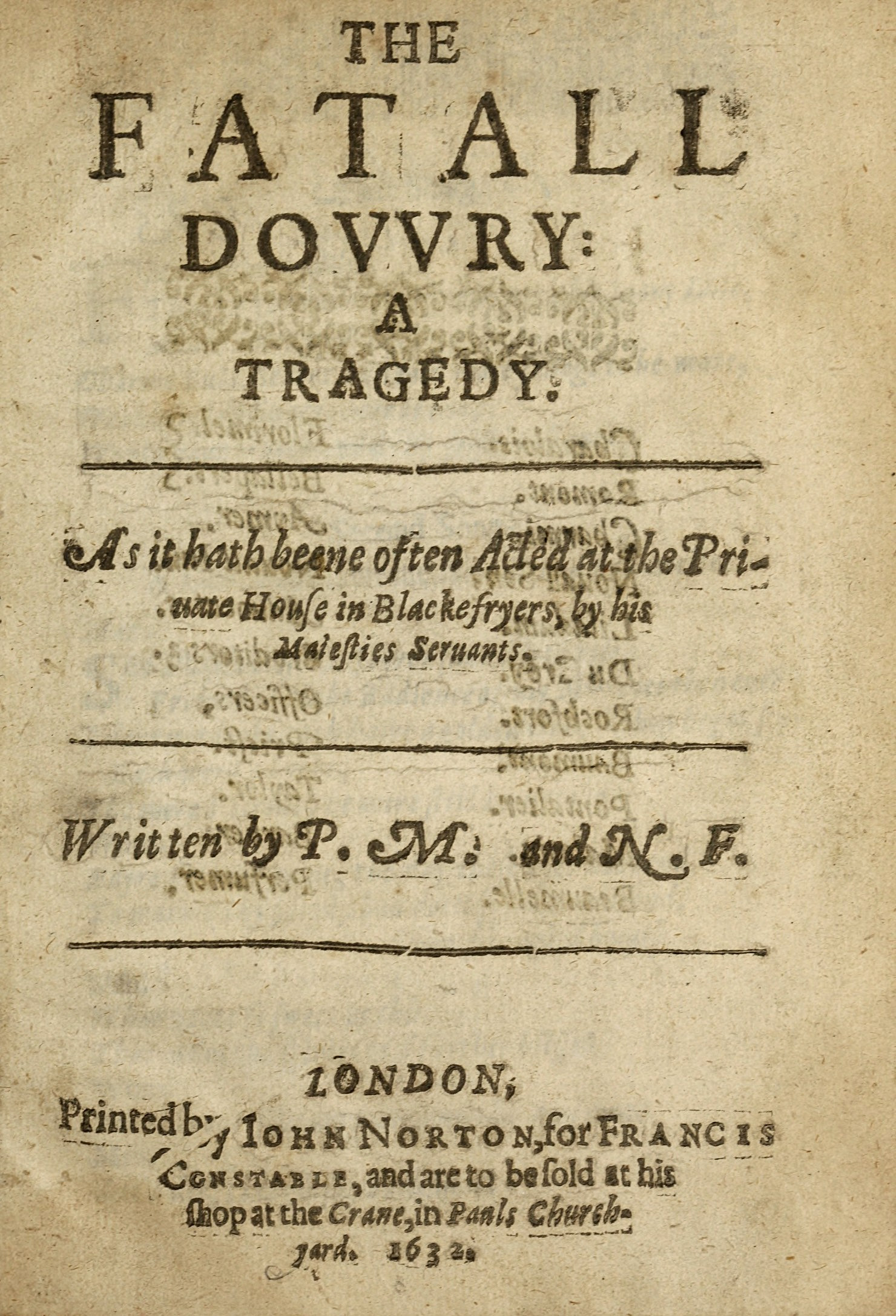
Title page of The Fatall Dowry (1632)

The Fatal Dowry is a late Jacobean era stage play, a tragedy written by Philip Massinger and Nathan Field, and first published in 1632. It represents a significant aspect of Field's very limited dramatic output.

Though hard evidence is lacking, the play is thought to have been composed c. 1619; it may have been the last writing for the theatre done by Field before his death in 1620. The play was acted by the King's Men at the Blackfriars Theatre. The 1632 quarto was printed by John Norton for the bookseller Francis Constable. The quarto's text is corrupt and badly printed.

== Synopsis ==
The play is set in Dijon in Burgundy in the later part of the fifteenth century, in the aftermath of the battles of Grandson, Morat (both 1476) and Nancy (1477), all mentioned in Act I, scene ii. The protagonist's father, the elder Charalois, was a general who had gone into debt to pay the expenses of his troops; unable to repay those charges, he died in debtor's prison, and his rapacious creditors refused to release his body for a proper burial. The general's son has taken his cause to court, but his suit is rejected by the judges, led by the hostile Novall Senior, president of the Dijon parlement. The younger Charalois amazes everyone by offering to assume his father's debts and take his place in prison, thus freeing his father's corpse. A retiring judge named Rochfort is impressed by Charalois' courage, virtue, and self-sacrifice, and decides to pay the general's debts himself.

Rochfort has an only daughter named Beaumelle, the centre of a set of fashionables and foppish young people, featuring the aristocratic Novall Junior and his hangers-on. Beaumelle's waiting-woman, Bellapert, is a cynical sensualist who tempts her mistress with the idea of marrying to enjoy sexual indulgence with many illicit lovers. Beaumelle's father is so taken with Charalois that he arranges a marriage between the young man and his daughter.

Novall Junior is furious about the marriage, since he has lost his chance of taking Beaumelle's virginity; but Bellapert assures him that the marriage will work to his advantage. Others, including Charalois' friend Romont, perceive the growing intimacy of Novall Junior and Beaumelle, and try to warn the parties involved – without success. Eventually, Beaumelle consummates her incipient affair with Novall Junior. Charalois walks in upon them, catching them in the act. Charalois challenges Novall Junior; Novall attempts to avoid the duel, but in the end, he fights with Charalois, and is killed.

Charalois stages a mock trial, with his father-in-law Rochfort as the judge. Rochfort, even in his emotional turmoil, hears Charalois' accusation and Beaumelle's confession, and sentences her to death. Charalois stabs her; Beaumelle dies. Novall Senior discovers his son's death, and has Charalois arrested and prosecuted. Charalois defends himself before the court, and wins an acquittal. One of Novall Junior's followers, however, is an ex-soldier named Pontalier who was redeemed from debtor's prison by the judge's son; repaying that favour, Pontalier stabs and kills Charalois in the court, and in turn is stabbed and killed by Romont.

== Authorship and reception ==
Scholars have estimated that the play is 60% Massinger's work, and 40% Field's. Field's hand is most prominent in Act II, in the second half of Act III, and in Act IV scene 1. The two collaborators divided the task according to their artistic strengths: Field wrote the portions of the play that deal with the fashionable world of Beaumelle and Novall Junior, while Massinger handled the parts involving soldiers, the law court, and the serious moral issues of the drama.

The play has been called "unique among the plays of the Massinger canon in being both weak in plot and unusually strong in characterization." The play has been praised by critics; Arthur Symons considered it one of Massinger's "two most distinct and most distinguished tragedies" (the other being The Duke of Milan).

== Adaptations ==
In 1702, Nicholas Rowe adapted The Fatal Dowry into a new version he titled The Fair Penitent. Aaron Hill also reworked Massinger and Field's play into his own version, The Insolvent (written c. 1732; published 1758). In both adapted and original forms, the play had success in revivals over a long period. Rowe's version was enormously popular in its era; an adaptation by Richard Lalor Sheil, starring Charles Macready, was done at Drury Lane and in Bath in 1825, and the original was performed at Sadler's Wells in 1845. Richard Beer-Hofmann's German-language play Der Graf von Charolais (1904) was based on The Fatal Dowry; it was filmed in 1922. T. A. Dunn produced a modern edition of the play in 1969. (In the same year, Malcolm Goldstein published a modern edition of Rowe's Fair Penitent.)

== Sources ==
- Dunn, T. A., ed. The Fatal Dowry. Berkeley, University of California Press, 1969.
- Garrett, Martin. Massinger: The Critical Heritage. London, Routledge, 1991.
- Lockhart, Lacy. "A Scene in The Fatal Dowry." Modern Language Notes Vol. 35 No. 5 (May 1920), pp. 291–3.
- Logan, Terence P., and Denzell S. Smith, eds. The Later Jacobean and Caroline Dramatists: A Survey and Bibliography of Recent Studies in English Renaissance Drama. Lincoln, NE, University of Nebraska Press, 1978.
- Phelan, James. On Philip Massinger. Halle, E. Karras, 1878.
- Sykes, H. Dugdale. Sidelights on Elizabethan Drama. London, Oxford University Press, 1924.
- Symons, Arthur. Studies in Two Literatures. London, Leonard Smithers, 1897.
