= John Fletcher (playwright) =

English playwright (1579–1625)

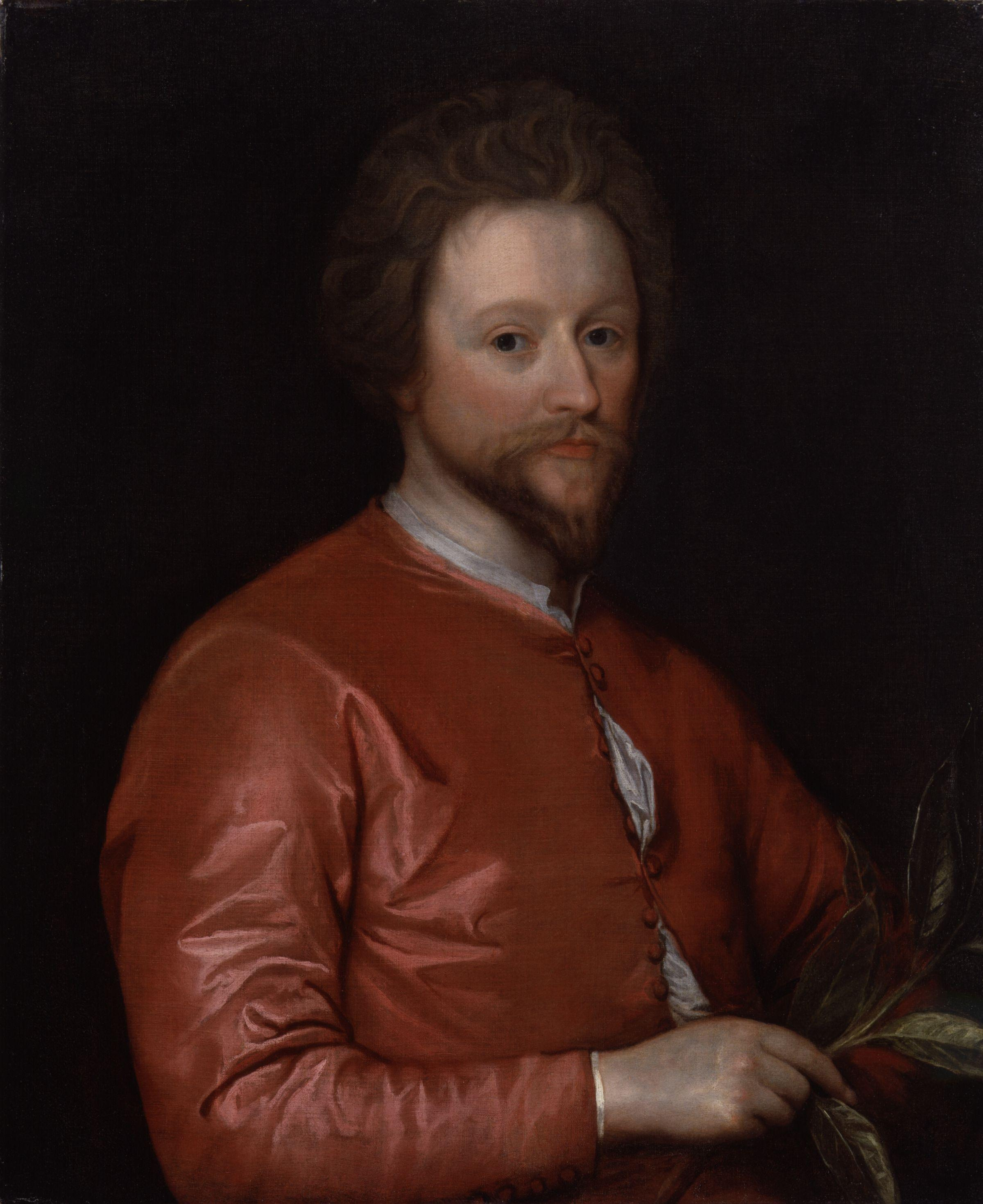
- Portrait, late 17th century
- Born: December 1579; Rye, Sussex, England
- Died: August 1625 (aged 45)
- Resting place: Southwark, Surrey, England
- Occupation: Writer
- Relatives: Richard Fletcher
- Writing career
- Period: Jacobean era
- Genre: Drama

John Fletcher (December 1579 – August 1625) was an English playwright. Following William Shakespeare as house playwright for the King's Men, he was among the most prolific and influential dramatists of his day; during his lifetime and in the Stuart Restoration, his fame rivalled Shakespeare's. Fletcher collaborated in writing plays, chiefly with Francis Beaumont or Philip Massinger, but also with Shakespeare and others. Although his reputation has subsequently declined, he remains an important transitional figure between the Elizabethan popular tradition and the popular drama of the Restoration.

== Early life ==
Fletcher was born in December 1579 (baptised 20 December) in Rye, Sussex, and died of the plague in August 1625 (buried 29 August in St. Saviour's, Southwark). His father Richard Fletcher was an ambitious and successful cleric who was in turn Dean of Peterborough, Bishop of Bristol, Bishop of Worcester and Bishop of London (shortly before his death), as well as chaplain to Queen Elizabeth. As Dean of Peterborough, Richard Fletcher, at the execution of Mary, Queen of Scots, at Fotheringhay Castle, "knelt down on the scaffold steps and started to pray out loud and at length, in a prolonged and rhetorical style as though determined to force his way into the pages of history". He cried out at her death, "So perish all the Queen's enemies!"

Richard Fletcher died shortly after falling out of favour with the Queen, over a marriage she had advised against. He appears to have been partly rehabilitated before his death in 1596 but he died substantially in debt. The upbringing of John Fletcher and his seven siblings was entrusted to his paternal uncle Giles Fletcher, a poet and minor official. His uncle's connections ceased to be a benefit and may even have become a liability after the rebellion of Robert Devereux, the Earl of Essex, who had been his patron. Fletcher appears to have entered Corpus Christi College, Cambridge, in 1591, at the age of eleven. It is not certain that he took a degree but evidence suggests that he was preparing for a career in the church. Little is known about his time at college but he evidently followed the path previously trodden by the University wits before him, from Cambridge to the burgeoning commercial theatre of London.

== Collaborations with Beaumont ==
In 1606, Fletcher began to appear as a playwright for the Children of the Queen's Revels, then performing at the Blackfriars Theatre. Commendatory verses by Richard Brome in the Beaumont and Fletcher 1647 folio place Fletcher in the company of Ben Jonson; a comment of Jonson's to Drummond corroborates this claim, although it is not known when this friendship began. At the beginning of his career, his most important association was with Francis Beaumont. The two wrote together for nearly a decade, first for the Children and then for the King's Men. According to an anecdote transmitted or invented by John Aubrey, they also lived together (in Bankside), sharing clothes and having "one wench in the house between them". This domestic arrangement, if it existed, was ended by Beaumont's marriage in 1613 and their dramatic partnership ended after Beaumont fell ill, probably of a stroke, the same year.

== Successor to Shakespeare ==
By this time, Fletcher had moved into a closer association with the King's Men. He collaborated with Shakespeare on Henry VIII, The Two Noble Kinsmen and the lost Cardenio, which is probably (according to some modern scholars) the basis for Lewis Theobald's play Double Falsehood. A play he wrote singly around this time, The Woman's Prize, or the Tamer Tamed, is a sequel to The Taming of the Shrew.

In 1616, after Shakespeare's death, Fletcher appears to have entered into an exclusive arrangement with the King's Men similar to Shakespeare's. Fletcher wrote only for that company between the death of Shakespeare and his death nine years later. He never lost his habit of collaboration, working with Nathan Field and later with Philip Massinger, who succeeded him as house playwright for the King's Men. His popularity continued throughout his life; during the winter of 1621, three of his plays were performed at court.

Fletcher died in 1625, apparently of the plague. He seems to have been buried in what is now Southwark Cathedral, although the precise location is not known; there is a reference by Aston Cockayne to a common grave for Fletcher and Massinger (also buried in Southwark). What is more certain is that two simple adjacent stones in the floor of the Choir of Southwark Cathedral, one marked 'Edmond Shakespeare 1607' the other 'John Fletcher 1625' refer to Shakespeare's younger brother and the playwright.

Fletcher's mastery is most notable in two dramatic types, tragicomedy and comedy of manners.

== Stage history ==
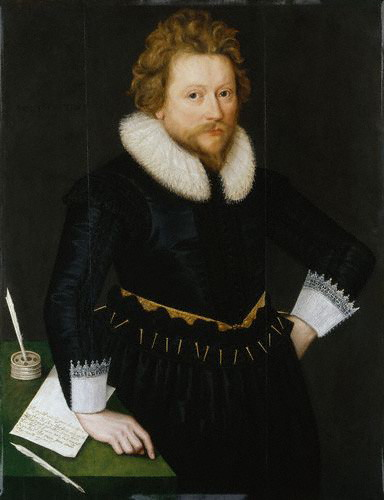
Portrait of John Fletcher

Fletcher's early career was marked by one significant failure, of The Faithful Shepherdess, his adaptation of Giovanni Battista Guarini's Il Pastor Fido, which was performed by the Blackfriars Children in 1608. In the preface to the printed edition of his play, Fletcher explained the failure as due to his audience's faulty expectations. They expected a pastoral tragicomedy to feature dances, comedy and murder, with the shepherds presented in conventional stereotypes—as Fletcher put it, wearing "gray cloaks, with curtailed dogs in strings". Fletcher's preface in defence of his play is best known for its pithy definition of tragicomedy: "A tragicomedy is not so called in respect of mirth and killing, but in respect it wants [i.e., lacks] deaths, which is enough to make it no tragedy; yet brings some near it, which is enough to make it no comedy". A comedy, he went on to say, must be "a representation of familiar people" and the preface is critical of drama that features characters whose action violates nature.

Fletcher appears to have been developing a new style faster than audiences could comprehend. By 1609, however, he had found his voice. With Beaumont, he wrote Philaster, which became a hit for the King's Men and began a profitable connection between Fletcher and that company. Philaster appears also to have initiated a vogue for tragicomedy; Fletcher's influence has been credited with inspiring some features of Shakespeare's late romances (Kirsch, 288–90) and his influence on the tragicomic work of other playwrights is even more marked. By the middle of the 1610s, Fletcher's plays had achieved a popularity that rivalled Shakespeare's and cemented the pre-eminence of the King's Men in Jacobean London. After Beaumont's retirement and early death in 1616, Fletcher continued working, singly and in collaboration, until his death in 1625. By that time, he had produced or had been credited with, close to fifty plays. This body of work remained a big part of the King's Men's repertory until the closing of the theatres in 1642.

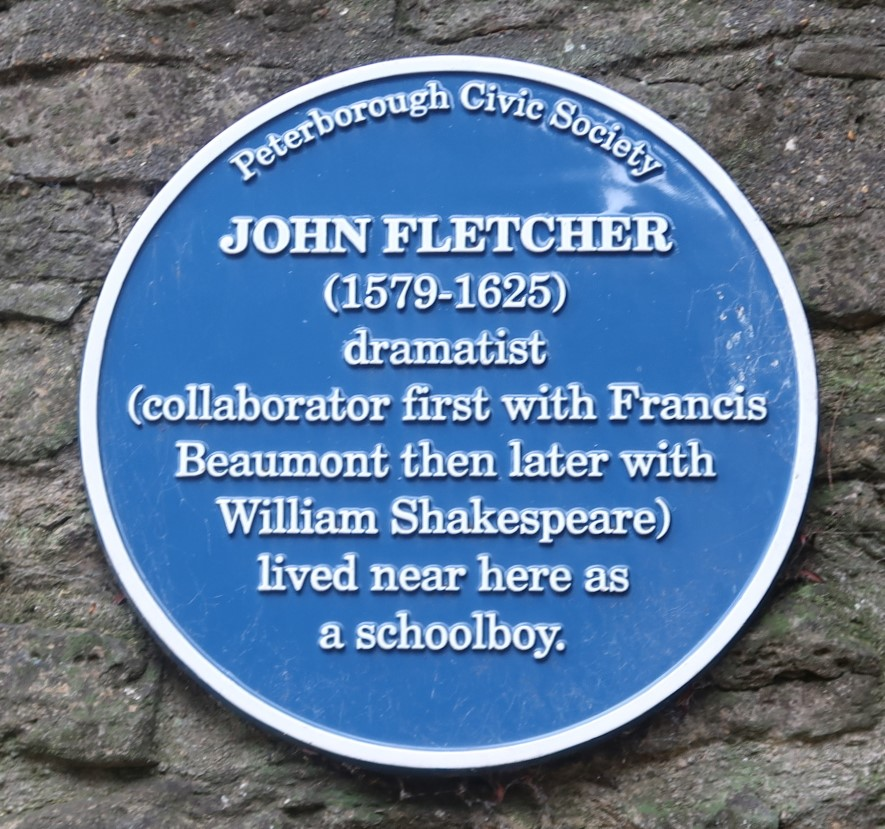
Blue Plaque to John Fletcher on the north boundary wall of Peterborough Cathedral grounds, near where he lived as a schoolboy

During the Commonwealth, many of Fletcher's best-known scenes were kept alive as drolls, the brief performances devised to satisfy the taste for plays while the theatres were suppressed. At the re-opening of the theatres in 1660, the plays in the Fletcher canon, in original form or revised, were by far the most common fare on the English stage. The most frequently revived plays suggest the developing taste for comedies of manners. Among the tragedies, The Maid's Tragedy and especially, Rollo Duke of Normandy held the stage. Four tragicomedies (A King and No King, The Humorous Lieutenant, Philaster and The Island Princess) were popular, perhaps in part for their similarity to and foreshadowing of heroic drama. Four comedies (Rule a Wife And Have a Wife, The Chances, Beggars' Bush and especially The Scornful Lady) were also popular. Fletcher's plays, relative to those of Shakespeare and to new productions, declined. By around 1710, Shakespeare's plays were more frequently performed and the rest of the century saw a steady erosion in performance of Fletcher's plays. By 1784, Thomas Davies asserted that only Rule a Wife and The Chances were still on stage. A generation later, Alexander Dyce mentioned only The Chances. Since then Fletcher has increasingly become a subject only for occasional revivals and for specialists. Fletcher and his collaborators have been the subject of important bibliographic and critical studies but the plays have been revived only infrequently.

== Plays ==
Because Fletcher collaborated regularly and widely, attempts to separate Fletcher's work from this collaborative fabric have experienced difficulties in attribution. Fletcher collaborated most often with Beaumont and Massinger but also with Nathan Field, Shakespeare and others. Some of his early collaborations with Beaumont were later revised by Massinger, adding another layer of complexity to the collaborative texture of the works. According to scholars such as Cyrus Hoy, Fletcher used distinctive textual and linguistic preferences, style and idiosyncrasies of spelling that identify his presence. According to Hoy's figures, he frequently uses ye instead of you at rates sometimes approaching 50 per cent. He employs 'em for them, along with a set of other preferences in contractions. He adds a sixth stressed syllable to a standard pentameter verse line—most often sir but also too or still or next. Various other habits and preferences may reveal his hand. The detection of this pattern, a Fletcherian textual profile, has persuaded some researchers that they have penetrated the Fletcher canon with what they consider success—and has in turn encouraged the use of similar techniques in the study of literature. [See: stylometry.] Scholars such as Jeffrey Masten and Gordon McMullan, have pointed out limitations of logic and method in Hoy's and others' attempts to distinguish playwrights on the basis of style and linguistic preferences.

This list of plays in Fletcher's canon provides likeliest composition dates, dates of first publication and dates of licensing by the Master of the Revels, where available.

=== Solo plays ===
- The Faithful Shepherdess, pastoral (written 1608–09; printed 1609?)
- Valentinian, tragedy (1610–14; 1647)
- Monsieur Thomas, comedy (c. 1610–16; 1639)
- The Woman's Prize, or The Tamer Tamed, comedy (c. 1611; 1647)
- Bonduca, tragedy (1611–14; 1647)
- The Chances, comedy (c. 1613–25; 1647)
- Wit Without Money, comedy (c. 1614; 1639)
- The Mad Lover, tragicomedy (acted 5 January 1617; 1647)
- The Loyal Subject, tragicomedy (licensed 16 November 1618; revised 1633?; 1647)
- The Humorous Lieutenant, tragicomedy (c. 1619; 1647)
- Women Pleased, tragicomedy (c. 1619–23; 1647)
- The Island Princess, tragicomedy (c. 1620; 1647)
- The Wild Goose Chase, comedy (c. 1621; 1652)
- The Pilgrim, comedy (c. 1621; 1647)
- A Wife for a Month, tragicomedy (licensed 27 May 1624; 1647)
- Rule a Wife and Have a Wife, comedy (licensed 19 October 1624; 1640)

=== Collaborations ===
With Francis Beaumont:

- The Woman Hater, comedy (1606; 1607)
- Cupid's Revenge, tragedy (c. 1607–12; 1615)
- Philaster, or Love Lies a-Bleeding, tragicomedy (c. 1609; 1620)
- The Coxcomb, comedy (c. 1608–10; 1647)
- The Maid's Tragedy, Tragedy (c. 1609; 1619)
- A King and No King, tragicomedy (1611; 1619)
- The Captain, comedy (c. 1609–12; 1647)
- The Scornful Lady, comedy (c. 1613; 1616)

With Massinger:

- Love's Cure, comedy (c. 1612–13; revised 1625?; 1647)
- Sir John van Olden Barnavelt, tragedy (August 1619; MS)
- The Little French Lawyer, comedy (c. 1619–23; 1647)
- A Very Woman, tragicomedy (c. 1619–22; licensed 6 June 1634; 1655)
- The Custom of the Country, comedy (c. 1619–23; 1647)
- The Double Marriage, tragedy (c. 1619–23; 1647)
- The False One, history (c. 1619–23; 1647)
- The Prophetess, tragicomedy (licensed 14 May 1622; 1647)
- The Sea Voyage, comedy (licensed 22 June 1622; 1647)
- The Spanish Curate, comedy (licensed 24 October 1622; 1647)
- The Lovers' Progress or The Wandering Lovers, tragicomedy (licensed 6 December 1623; revised 1634; 1647)
- The Elder Brother, comedy (c. 1625; 1637)

With Massinger and Field:

- The Honest Man's Fortune, tragicomedy (1613; 1647)
- Thierry and Theodoret, tragedy (c. 1607; 1621)
- Beggars' Bush, comedy (c. 1612–13; revised 1622?; 1647)
- The Queen of Corinth, tragicomedy (c. 1616–18; 1647)
- Rollo Duke of Normandy, or The Bloody Brother, tragedy (c. 1617; revised 1627–30?; 1639)
- The Knight of Malta, tragicomedy (c. 1619; 1647)

With Shakespeare:

- Henry VIII, history (c. 1613; 1623)
- The Two Noble Kinsmen, tragicomedy (c. 1613; 1634)
- Cardenio, tragicomedy? (c. 1613)

With Middleton and Rowley:

- Wit at Several Weapons, comedy (c. 1610–20; 1647)

With Rowley:

- The Maid in the Mill (licensed 29 August 1623; 1647).

With Field:

- Four Plays, or Moral Representations, in One, morality (c. 1608–13; 1647)
- Love's Pilgrimage, tragicomedy (c. 1615–16; 1647)

With Shirley:

- The Night Walker, or The Little Thief, comedy (c. 1611; 1640)

With Ford:

- The Noble Gentleman, comedy (c. 1613?; licensed 3 February 1626; 1647)

Uncertain:

- The Nice Valour, or The Passionate Madman, comedy (c. 1615–25; 1647)
- The Laws of Candy, tragicomedy (c. 1619–23; 1647)
- The Fair Maid of the Inn, comedy (licensed 22 January 1626; 1647)
- The Faithful Friends, tragicomedy (registered 29 June 1660; MS.)

The Nice Valour may be a play by Fletcher revised by Thomas Middleton; The Fair Maid of the Inn is perhaps a play by Massinger, John Ford and John Webster, either with or without Fletcher's involvement. The Laws of Candy has been variously attributed to Fletcher and to John Ford. The Night-Walker was a Fletcher original, with additions by Shirley for a 1639 production. Some of the attributions given above are disputed by scholars, as noted in connection with Four Plays in One. Rollo Duke of Normandy, an especially difficult case and source of much disagreement among scholars, may have been written around 1617 and later revised by Massinger.

The first Beaumont and Fletcher folio of 1647 collected 35 plays, most not published before. The second folio of 1679 added 18 more, for a total of 53. The first folio included The Masque of the Inner Temple and Gray's Inn (1613) and the second The Knight of the Burning Pestle (1607) both thought to be written by Beaumont alone, although the latter was in early editions attributed to both writers. Sir John Van Olden Barnavelt, existed in manuscript and was not published till 1883. In 1640 James Shirley's The Coronation was misattributed to Fletcher upon its initial publication and was included in the second Beaumont and Fletcher folio of 1679.
