= Nathan Field =

English actor and dramatist (1587–1620)

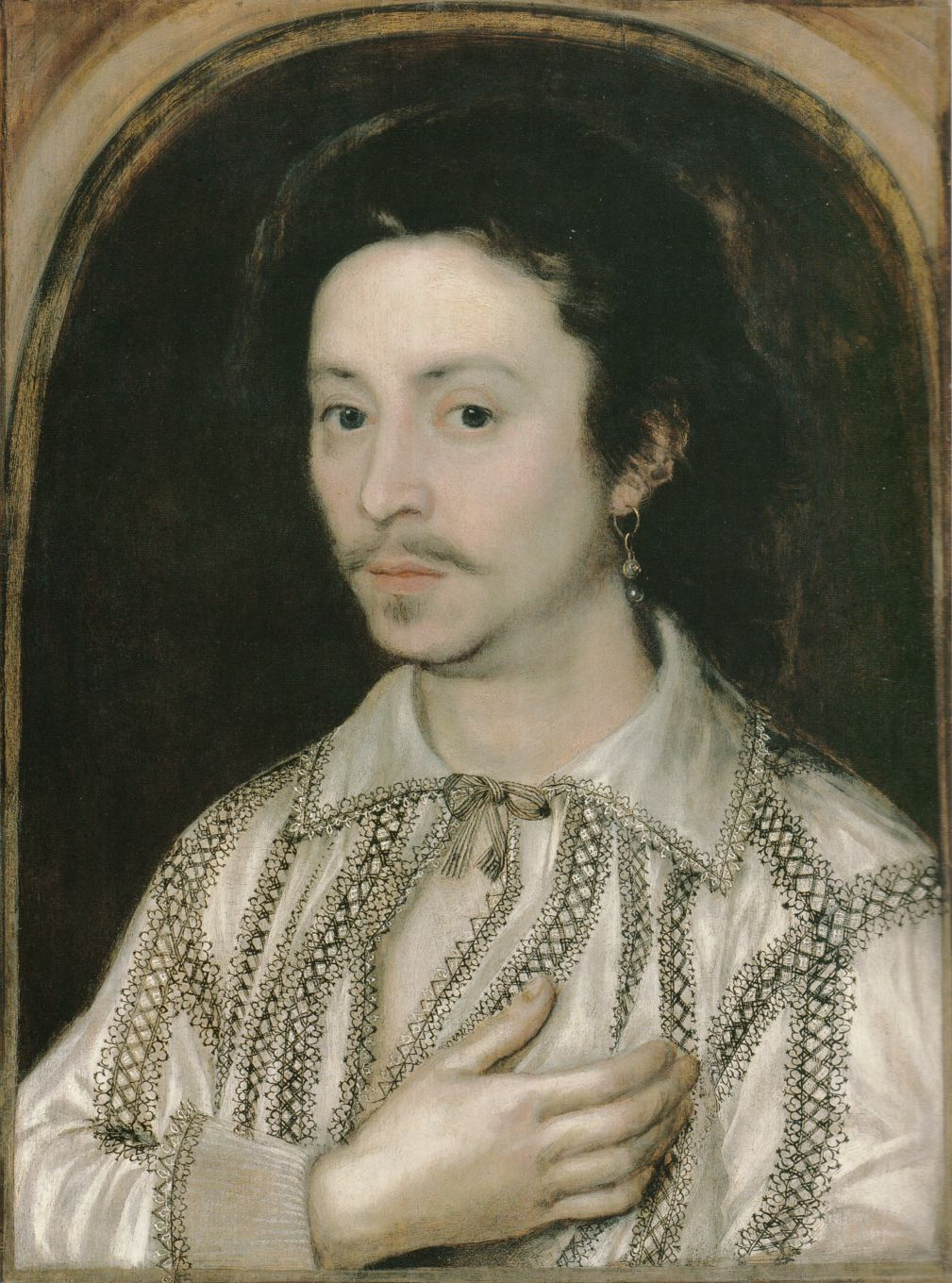
- Portrait of Nathan Field, unknown artist, Dulwich Picture Gallery, London, c. 1615.
- Born: 17 October 1587
- Died: 1620 (aged 32–33)
- Occupations: English dramatist, actor

Nathan Field (also spelled Feild occasionally; 17 October 1587 – 1620) was an English dramatist and actor.

== Life ==
His father was the Puritan preacher John Field, and his brother Theophilus Field became the Bishop of Llandaff. One of his brothers, named Nathaniel, often confused with the actor, became a printer.

Nathan's father opposed London's public entertainments: he delivered a sermon that attributed Divine judgment to the collapse of the public seating area, during a bear baiting on a Sunday, at Beargarden in 1583, which resulted in several deaths. Nathan presumably did not intend a career in the theatre; he was a student of Richard Mulcaster at St. Paul's School in the late 1590s. At some point before 1600, he was impressed by Nathaniel Giles, the master of Elizabeth's choir and one of the managers of the new troupe of boy players at Blackfriars Theatre, called alternately the Children of the Chapel Royal and the Blackfriars Children. He remained in this profession for the remainder of his life, later adding to it the profession of a playwright. John Field was buried on 26 March 1588.

When John Field died, he left seven children, of whom the eldest was only seventeen. He left all his property to his wife, Joan. The first child was a daughter, Dorcas, baptized on 7 May 1570. The first son was baptized on 4 January 1572 and was named after his father, John. Theophilus was baptized on 22 January 1574, Jonathan on 13 May 1577, Nathaniel on 13 June 1581, Elizabeth on 2 February 1583 and Nathan on 17 October 1587. Little is known of the two daughters: Dorcas was married to Edward Rice on 9 November 1590; Elizabeth was buried at St. Anne, Blackfriars, on 14 June 1603, when she had just reached twenty, the age at which Dorcas married. We know nothing of the life of John Field, junior. Jonathan Field, who died in 1640. Theophilus followed his father's profession. He married and in his will left all his possessions to his wife, Alice. He died on 2 June 1636 and was buried in Hereford Cathedral.

As a member of the Children of the Queen's Revels, Field acted in the innovative drama staged at Blackfriars in the first years of the 17th century. Cast lists associate him with Ben Jonson's Cynthia's Revels (1600) and The Poetaster (1601); a 1641 quarto associated him with George Chapman's Bussy D'Ambois.

Later in the decade, he performed in Epicoene and, perhaps, played Humphrey in Francis Beaumont's The Knight of the Burning Pestle. During the same years, he wrote commendatory verses for Jonson's Volpone and Catiline, and for John Fletcher's The Faithful Shepherdess.

Field was presumably also among those of the children's company briefly imprisoned for the official displeasure occasioned by Eastward Hoe and John Day's The Isle of Gulls; the latter imprisonment was in Bridewell Prison.

Field stayed with a children's company until 1613, his twenty-sixth year. He appears to be the only one of the boy actors of 1600 to remain with the Blackfriars troupe when, in 1609, Philip Rosseter and Robert Keysar assumed control of the company. In this company, he performed in the theatre in Whitefriars and, frequently, at court, in plays such as Beaumont and Fletcher's The Coxcomb. From the latter years of this period come the first of his plays: A Woman is a Weathercock and The Honest Man's Fortune (the latter with Fletcher and Philip Massinger).

In 1613, Rosseter combined his company with the Lady Elizabeth's Men, managed by Philip Henslowe. Performing at the Swan Theatre and Hope Theatre, Field acted in Thomas Middleton's A Chaste Maid in Cheapside and Jonson's Bartholomew Fair. For the latter play, in which he may have performed as Cokes or Littlewit, he received payment for the company after a performance at court. These years witnessed some degree of tumult; Henslowe's business practices resulted in his actors' drawing up certain "articles of grievance" against him, and Rosseter's attempt to build a new private theater (Porter's Hall) in Blackfriars was blocked by the city and Privy Council. This period ended when Henslowe died, Rosseter abandoned his plans, and Lady Elizabeth's Men briefly merged and then separated from Prince Charles's Men, thereafter touring in the country. For Field, the period had a presumably more satisfactory end: by late 1616, he had joined the King's Men.

With the King's Men, Field seems to have performed as Voltore in Volpone and as Face in The Alchemist. It is not clear what other parts he played; an epigram, produced by John Payne Collier, that associated the actor with the role of Othello is an apparent forgery. Edmond Malone supposed that Field played women's roles with the company; O. J. Campbell, however, suggests that he played young second leads. Of course he acted in a number of Fletcher's plays, as well as Shakespeare's; presumably he also acted in his own Amends for Ladies (printed 1618, though probably written earlier), and in The Fatal Dowry, which he wrote with Philip Massinger. Field died some time between May 1619 and August 1620.

Scholars and critics have argued for authorial contributions from Field in a number of plays of his era, most commonly in Four Plays in One, The Honest Man's Fortune, The Queen of Corinth and The Knight of Malta, four dramas in the canon of Fletcher and his collaborators.

Field had a contemporary reputation as a ladies' man; gossip reported by William Trumbull charges him with a child of the Countess of Argyll. A portrait believed to be of Field can be seen at Dulwich Picture Gallery in London, UK, in which he is depicted as a melancholy figure with hand on heart. It has been said that this painting may be one of the first depictions of an actor "in character". The portrait artist is unknown, but some believe that it was painted by William Larkin.

== Works ==
Solo plays

- A Woman Is a Weathercock, comedy (c. 1609–10)
- Amends for Ladies, comedy (printed 1618)

With John Fletcher and Philip Massinger:

- The Honest Man's Fortune, tragicomedy (1613)
- The Queen of Corinth, tragicomedy (c. 1616–18)
- The Knight of Malta, tragicomedy (c. 1619)

With Philip Massinger:

- The Fatal Dowry, tragedy (c. 1619)

With John Fletcher:

- Four Plays in One (c. 1608–13)

== Cultural references ==
Susan Cooper's children's novel King of Shadows features Nathan Field as a character. Set in 1599, it uses Field's background as a student of Richard Mulcaster's at St Paul's as a springboard. The Nathan Field in the story, who briefly works at Shakespeare's Globe Theatre, is actually a like-named boy from 1999, who has switched places with the young Elizabethan actor.

== Sources ==
- Brinkley, Roberta F. Nathan Field, the Actor-Playwright. New Haven: Yale University Press, 1928.
- Cooper, Susan. King of Shadows. London: The Bodley Head, 1999.
- Cousin, John William (1910), "Field, Nathaniel", A Short Biographical Dictionary of English Literature, London: J. M. Dent & Sons – via Wikisource
- Nunzeger, Edwin. A Dictionary of Actors and of Other Persons Associated With the Public Presentation of Plays in England Before 1642. New Haven: Yale University Press, 1929.
- Radice, Michael L. (2000). Museum Theater as an Interpretive Method: Nathan Field's Personal Dilemma (PhD). The Union Institute and University.
