= Cyrus Hoy =

20th/21st-century American academic and literary scholar

Cyrus Henry Hoy (February 26, 1926 – April 27, 2010) was an American literary scholar of the English Renaissance stage who taught at the University of Virginia and Vanderbilt University, and was the John B. Trevor Professor of English (emeritus, 1994) at the University of Rochester. He wrote and published on a wide range of topics in English literature, though he is best known for his works on William Shakespeare, Beaumont and Fletcher, and other figures in English Renaissance theatre.

== Career ==
Probably his most frequently-cited work is his study of authorship problems in the Beaumont/Fletcher plays. Titled "The Shares of Fletcher and His Collaborators in the Beaumont and Fletcher Canon," it was published in seven annual issues of the journal Studies in Bibliography, published by the Bibliographical Society of the University of Virginia (1956–62). Hoy identified specific linguistic markers for individual dramatists, most notably a highly distinctive pattern of preferences for John Fletcher, and then employed those markers to distinguish the respective contributions of the collaborators. Hoy's method and results have earned, if not unanimous acclaim, then at least a high level of recognition for usefulness and validity, and his study stands as a major step forward in the development of stylometric techniques of literary analysis.

Hoy edited a number of plays for modern editions, including the first five volumes in the New Cambridge Beaumont and Fletcher series, the Norton Critical Edition of Hamlet, and plays by Thomas Dekker and Philip Massinger. He published books and journal articles on specific topics in English Renaissance and Restoration drama, as well as a variety of other subjects, from Charlotte Perkins Gilman to Marianne Moore. Perhaps his most noteworthy single work is his book The Hyacinth Room: An Investigation Into the Nature of Comedy, Tragedy, and Tragicomedy, published in 1964. He served as the general editor of the Regents Renaissance Drama series, and was a Guggenheim Fellow.
