= List of compositions by Henry Purcell =

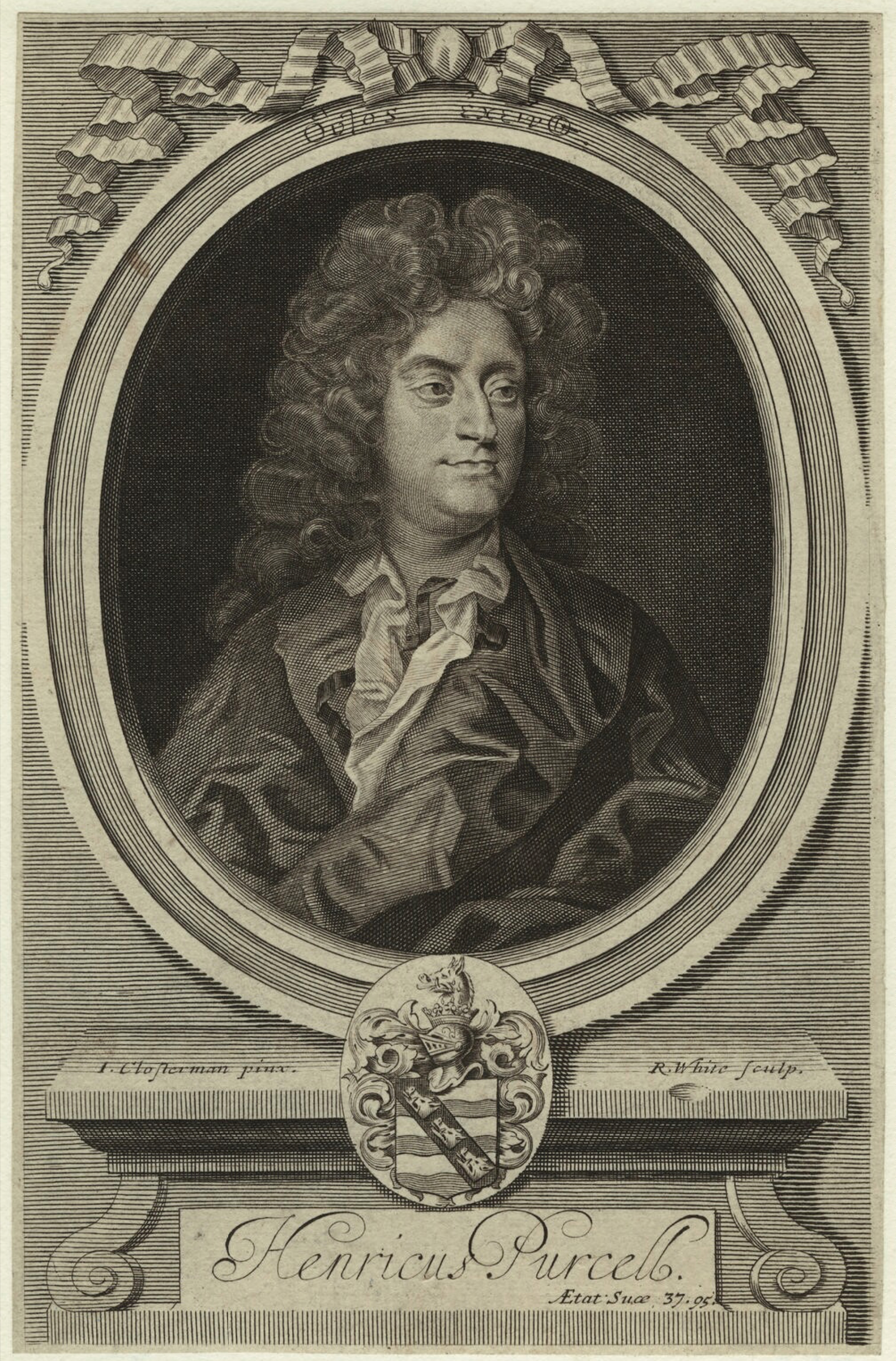
Engraved portrait of Purcell by R. White after Closterman, from Orpheus Britannicus

This is a list of musical compositions by Henry Purcell.

== By Z number ==
Pieces listed according to the Zimmerman catalogue.

=== Anthems ===
- Z. 1, Verse Anthem, "Awake, put on thy strength" (c. 1682–85)
- Z. 2, Verse Anthem, "Behold, I bring you glad tidings" (1687)
- Z. 3, Verse Anthem, "Behold now, praise the Lord" (c. 1680)
- Z. 4, Verse Anthem, "Be merciful unto me" (1683 or before)
- Z. 5, Verse Anthem, "Blessed are they that fear the Lord" (1688)
- Z. 6, Verse Anthem, "Blessed be the Lord my strength" (before 1679)
- Z. 7, Verse Anthem, "Blessed is he that considereth the poor" (c. 1688)
- Z. 8, Verse Anthem, "Blessed is he whose unrighteousness is forgiven" (c. 1680–92)
- Z. 9, Verse Anthem, "Blessed is the man that feareth the Lord" (c. 1688)
- Z. 10, Full Anthem, "Blow up the trumpet in Sion" (before 1679)
- Z. 11, Verse Anthem, "Bow down thine ear, O Lord" (c. 1680–82)
- Z. 12, Verse Anthem, "Give sentence with me, O Lord" (before 1681)
- Z. 13, Verse Anthem, "Hear me, O Lord, and that soon" (c. 1680–82) – [There are 2 arrangements of this piece, Z. 13A and Z. 13B respectively]
- Z. 14, Verse Anthem, "Hear my prayer, O God" (before 1683)
- Z. 15, Full Anthem, "Hear my prayer, O Lord" in C minor, for Chorus (before 1683)
- Z. 16, Verse Anthem, "In thee, O Lord, do I put my trust" (c. 1682)
- Z. 17, Full Anthem, "In the midst of life" (before 1682) – [There are 2 arrangements of this piece, Z. 17A and Z. 17B respectively]
- Z. 18, Verse Anthem, "It is a good thing to give thanks" (c. 1682–85)
- Z. 19, Verse Anthem, "I was glad when they said unto me" in G major for Chorus (c. 1682–83)
- Z. 20, Verse Anthem, "I will give thanks unto Thee, O Lord" (c. 1682–85)
- Z. 21, Verse Anthem, "I will give thanks unto the Lord" (c. 1680–82)
- Z. 22, Full Anthem, "I will sing unto the Lord" (before 1679)
- Z. 23, Verse Anthem, "Let God arise" (before 1679)
- Z. 24, Verse Anthem, "Let mine eyes run down with tears" (c. 1682) for Chorus and Continuo
- Z. 25, Full Anthem, "Lord, how long wilt Thou be angry?" (c. 1680–82) for chorus
- Z. 26, Verse Anthem, "Lord, who can tell how oft he offendeth?" (c. 1677)
- Z. 27, Full Anthem, "Man that is born of woman" (c. 1680–82)
- Z. 28, Verse Anthem, "My beloved spake" in F major (before 1677) for Chorus and Strings
- Z. 29, Verse Anthem, "My heart is fixed, O God" (c. 1682–85)
- Z. 30, Verse Anthem, "My heart is inditing" (1685)
- Z. 31, Verse Anthem, "My song shall be always" (1690)
- Z. 32, Verse Anthem, "O consider my adversity" (Unknown)
- Z. 33, Verse Anthem, "O give thanks unto the Lord" (1693)
- Z. 34, Full Anthem, "O God, the king of glory" in B minor (before 1679) for chorus
- Z. 35, Full Anthem, "O God, thou art my god" (c. 1680–82)
- Z. 36, Full Anthem, "O God, thou has cast us out" (c. 1680–82)
- Z. 37, Full Anthem, "O Lord God of hosts" (c. 1680–82)
- Z. 38, Verse Anthem, "O Lord, grant the King a long life" (1685)
- Z. 39, Verse Anthem, "O Lord, our governor" in C minor (before 1679) for 5 Voices, Chorus, and Continuo
- Z. 40, Verse Anthem, "O Lord, rebuke me not" (Unknown)
- Z. 41, Verse Anthem, "O Lord, Thou art my God" (c. 1680–82)
- Z. 42, Verse Anthem, "O praise God in his holiness" (c. 1682–85)
- Z. 43, Verse Anthem, "O praise the Lord, all ye heathen" (before 1681)
- Z. 44, Verse Anthem, "O sing unto the Lord" (1688)
- Z. 45, Verse Anthem, "Out of the deep have I called" (c. 1680)
- Z. 46, Verse Anthem, "Praise the Lord, O Jerusalem” (1689)
- Z. 46a, Verse Anthem, “Praise the Lord, ye Servants” (1698) (This anthem was a fragment of Z. 46)
- Z. 47, Verse Anthem, "Praise the Lord, O my soul, and all that is within me" (c. 1682–85)
- Z. 48, Verse Anthem, "Praise the Lord, O my soul, O Lord my God" (1687)
- Z. 49, Verse Anthem, "Rejoice in the Lord alway" in C major (c. 1682–85) for 3 Voices, Chorus, and Strings
- Z. 50, Full Anthem, "Remember not, Lord, our offences" in A minor (c. 1679–82) for Chorus
- Z. 51, Full Anthem, "Save me, O God" (before 1681)
- Z. 52, Verse Anthem, "Sing unto God" (1687)
- Z. 53, Verse Anthem, "The Lord is king, be the people never so impatient" (Unknown)
- Z. 54, Verse Anthem, "The Lord is King, the earth may be glad [thereof]" (1688)
- Z. 55, Verse Anthem, "The Lord is my light" (c. 1682–85)
- Z. 56, Verse Anthem, "The way of God is an undefiled way" (1694)
- Z. 57, Verse Anthem, "They that go down to the sea in ships" (1685)
- Z. 58, Verse Anthem, "Thou knowest, Lord, the secrets of our hearts" (1687) – (There are 2 arrangements of this piece in Z. 58a, and Z. 58b, with Z. 58b being the full anthem)
- Z. 59, Full Anthem, "Thy righteousness, O God, is very high" (Unknown)
- Z. 60, Verse Anthem, "Thy way, O God, is holy" (1687)
- Z. 61, Verse Anthem, "Thy word is a lantern unto my feet" (Unknown)
- Z. 62, Verse Anthem, "Turn thou us, O good Lord" (Unknown)
- Z. 63, Verse Anthem, "Unto Thee will I cry" (c. 1682–85)
- Z. 64, Verse Anthem, "Who hath believed our report?" (c. 1679–80)
- Z. 65, Verse Anthem, "Why do the heathen so furiously rage together?" (c. 1682–85)

=== Hymns and sacred songs [Z. 101–200] ===
- Z. 101, Catch, "Joy, mirth, triumphs I do defy" (Unknown) – [Possibly originally an Alleluia]
- Z. 103, Gloria, "Gloria Patri et Filio" (c. 1680)
- Z. 104, Gloria, "Gloria Patri et Filio" – Canon 3 in 1 (c. 1680)
- Z. 105, Gloria, "Gloria Patri et Filio" – Canon 4 in 1 per arsin et thesin in D minor, for chorus (c. 1680)
- Z. 106, Gloria, "Gloria Patri et Filio" – Canon 4 in 1 (c. 1680)
- Z. 107, Gloria, "Gloria Patri et Filio" – Canon 7 in 1 at the unison (Unknown)
- Z. 108, Sacred Song, "Laudate Dominum" – Canon 3 in 1 (Unknown)
- Z. 109, Sacred Song, "Miserere mei" – Canon 4 in 2 (published 1687)
- Z. 120, Chant in A minor (Unknown) – [Z. 120 through Z. 125 are of doubtful provenance]
- Z. 121, Chant in G major
- Z. 122, Chant in G major
- Z. 123, Chant in D minor
- Z. 124, Chant in G major

(The authorship of pieces Z. 121-124 remain uncertain)

- Z. 125, Burford psalm-tune in G minor (authorship uncertain)
- Z. 130, Sacred Hymn, "Ah! few and full of sorrow" (c. 1680)
- Z. 131, Sacred Hymn, "Beati omnes [qui timent Dominum]" in G minor, for Chorus and Continuo (c. 1680)
- Z. 132, Sacred Hymn, "Early, O Lord, my fainting soul" (c. 1680)
- Z. 133, Sacred Hymn, "Hear me, O Lord, the great support" (1680–82)
- Z. 134, Hymn, "In guilty night" (published 1693)
- Z. 135, Psalm, "Jehova, quam multi sunt hostes" in A minor, for 2 Voices, Chorus, and Continuo (c. 1680)
- Z. 136, Sacred Hymn, "Lord, I can suffer thy rebukes" in G minor, for 4 Voices, and Continuo (c. 1680)
- Z. 137, Sacred Hymn, "Lord, not to us, but to thy name" (c. 1680)
- Z. 138, Sacred Hymn, "O all ye people, clap your hands" (c. 1680)
- Z. 139, Sacred Hymn, "O happy man that fears the Lord" (Unknown)
- Z. 140, Sacred Hymn, "O, I'm sick of life" (c. 1680)
- Z. 141, Sacred Hymn, "O Lord our governor" (c. 1680)
- Z. 142, Sacred Hymn, "Plung'd in the confines of despair" (c. 1680)
- Z. 143, Sacred Hymn, "Since God, so tender a regard" (c. 1680)
- Z. 144, Sacred Hymn, "When on my sickbed I languish" (c. 1680)
- Z. 181, Hymn, "Awake, and with attention hear" (published 1681)
- Z. 182, Hymn, "Awake, ye dead" (published 1693)
- Z. 183, Hymn, "Begin the song, and strike the living lyre" (published 1681)
- Z. 184, Hymn, "Close thine eyes and sleep secure" (published 1688)
- Z. 185, Hymn, "Full of wrath his threatening breath" (Unknown)
- Z. 186, Hymn, "Great God and just" (published 1688)
- Z. 187, Hymn, "Hosanna to the highest" (Unknown)
- Z. 188, Hymn, "How have I strayed" (published 1688)
- Z. 189, Hymn, "How long, great God?" (published 1688)
- Z. 190, Hymn, "In the black dismal dungeon of despair" (published 1688)
- Z. 191, Hymn, "Let the night perish" (published 1688)
- Z. 192, Hymn, "Lord, what is man?" (published 1693)
- Z. 193, Hymn, "Now that the sun hath veiled his light" ("An Evening Hymn On A Ground") (published 1688)
- Z. 195, Hymn, "Sleep, Adam[, sleep and take thy rest]" (published 1688)
- Z. 196, Hymn, "Tell me, some pitying angel" (published 1693)
- Z. 197, Hymn, "The earth trembled" (published 1688)
- Z. 198, Hymn, "Thou wakeful shepherd" (published 1688)
- Z. 199, Hymn, "We sing to him, whose wisdom form'd the ear" (published 1688)
- Z. 200, Hymn, "With sick and famish'd eyes" (published 1688)

=== Services ===
- Z. 230/1, Morning Service, "Te Deum Laudamus in B♭ major" for Te Deum (before 1682)
- Z. 230/2, Morning Service, "Benedictus in B♭ major" (before 1682) scoring of Benedictus
- Z. 230/3, Morning Service, "Benedicite Omnia Opera in B♭ major" (before 1682)
- Z. 230/4, Morning Service, "Jubilate Deo in B♭ major" (before 1682)
- Z. 230/5, Communion Service, "Kyrie Eleison in B♭ major" (before 1682)
- Z. 230/6, Communion Service, "Nicene Creed in B♭ major" (before 1682)
- Z. 230/7, Evening Service, "Magnificat in B♭ major" (before 1682)
- Z. 230/8, Evening Service, "Nunc dimittis in B♭ major" (before 1682)
- Z. 230/9, Evening Service, "Cantate Domino in B♭ major" (before 1682)
- Z. 230/10, Evening Service, "Deus misereatur in B♭ major" (before 1682)
- Z. 231 Evening Service Vespers in G minor for 6 Voices, Chorus, and Continuo
- Z. 232,"Te Deum and Jubilate Deo in D major" (1694), for 6 Voices, Chorus, and Orchestra

=== Catches ===
- Z. 240, Catch, "A health to the nut-brown lass" (1685)
- Z. 241, Catch, "An ape, a lion, a fox and an ass" (1686)
- Z. 242, Catch, "As Roger last night to Jenny lay close" (Unknown)
- Z. 243, Catch, "Bring the bowl and cool Nantz" (1693–94)
- Z. 244, Catch, "Call for the reckoning" (Unknown)
- Z. 245, Catch, "Come let us drink" (Unknown)
- Z. 246, Catch, "Come my hearts, play your parts" (1685)
- Z. 247, Catch, "Down, down with Bacchus" (1693)
- Z. 248, Catch, "Drink on till night be spent" (1686)
- Z. 249, Catch, "Full bags, a brisk bottle" (1686)
- Z. 250, Catch, "God save our sovereign Charles" (1685)
- Z. 251, Catch, "Great Apollo and Bacchus" (Unknown)
- Z. 252, Catch, "Here's a health, pray let it pass" (Unknown)
- Z. 253, Catch, "Here's that will challenge all the fair" (1680)
- Z. 254, Catch, "He that drinks is immortal" (1686)
- Z. 255, Catch, "If all be true that I do think" (1689)
- Z. 256, Catch, "I gave her cakes and I gave her ale" (1690)
- Z. 257, Catch, "Is Charleroy's siege come too?" (1693)
- Z. 258, Catch, "Let the grave folks go preach" (1685)
- Z. 259, Catch, "Let us drink to the blades" (1691)
- Z. 260, Catch, "My lady's coachman, John" (1688)
- Z. 261, Catch, "Now England's great council's assembled" (1685)
- Z. 262, Catch, "Now, now we are met and humours agree" (1688)
- Z. 263, Catch, "Of all the instruments that are" (1693)
- Z. 264, Catch, "Once in our lives let us drink to our wives" (1686)
- Z. 265, Catch, "Once, twice, thrice, I Julia tried" (Unknown)
- Z. 266, Catch, "One industrious insect" (Unknown)
- Z. 267, Catch, "Pale faces, stand by" (1688)
- Z. 268, Catch, "Pox on you for a fop" (Unknown)
- Z. 269, Catch, "Prithee be n't so sad and serious" (Unknown)
- Z. 270, Catch, "Room for th'express" (1694)
- Z. 271, Catch, "Since the duke is return's" (1685)
- Z. 272, Catch, "Since time so kind to us does prove" (Unknown)
- Z. 273, Catch, "Sir Walter enjoying his damsel" (Unknown)
- Z. 274, Catch, "Soldier, soldier, take off thy wine" (Unknown)
- Z. 275, Catch, "Sum up all the delights" (1688)
- Z. 276, Catch, "The Macedon youth" (1686)
- Z. 277, Catch, "The miller's daughter riding" (1686)
- Z. 278, Catch, "The surrender of Limerick" (1691)
- Z. 279, Catch, "'Tis easy to force" (1685)
- Z. 280, Catch, "'Tis too late for a coach" (1686)
- Z. 281, Catch, "'Tis women makes us love" (1685)
- Z. 282, Catch, "To all lovers of music" (1687)
- Z. 283, Catch, "To thee, to thee and to a maid" (1685)
- Z. 284, Catch, "True Englishmen drink a good health" (c. 1689)
- Z. 285, Catch, "Under a green elm lies Luke Shepherd's helm" (1686)
- Z. 286, Catch, "Under this stone lies Gabriel John" (1686)
- Z. 287, Catch, "When V and I together meet" (1686)
- Z. 288, Catch, "Who comes there?" (1685)
- Z. 289, Catch, "Wine in a morning makes us frolic and gay" (1686)
- Z. 290, Catch, "Would you know how we meet" (1685)
- Z. 291, Catch, "Young Colin cleaving of a beam" (1691)
- Z. 292, Catch, "Young John the gard'ner" (1683)

=== Odes and welcome songs ===
- Z. 320, Ode, "Arise my Muse" (1690)
- Z. 321, Ode, "Celebrate this festival" for 5 Voices, Chorus, and Orchestra (1693)
- Z. 322, Ode, "Celestial music did the gods inspire" (1689)
- Z. 323, Ode, "Come Ye Sons of Art” in D major, for 4 Voices, Chorus, and Orchestra (1694)
- Z. 324, Ode, "Fly, bold rebellion" (1683)
- Z. 325, Ode, "From hardy climes and dangerous toils of war" (1683)
- Z. 326, Ode, "From those serene and rapturous joys" (1684)
- Z. 327, Ode, "Great parent, hail!" (1694)
- Z. 328, Ode, "Hail, bright Cecilia!" in D major for 5 Voices, Chorus, and Orchestra (1692) (this piece is also referred to as “Ode7 for St. Cecilia’s Day 1692”
- Z. 329, Ode, "Laudate Ceciliam" (1683)
- Z. 331, Ode, "Love's goddess sure was blind" (1692)
- Z. 332, Ode, "Now does the glorious day appear" (1689)
- Z. 333, Ode, "Of old when heroes thought it base" for 5 Voices, Chorus, and Orchestra (1690) (this piece is also referred to as the “Yorkshire Feast Song”)
- Z. 334, Ode, "Raise raise the voice" (c. 1685)
- Z. 335, Ode, "Sound the trumpet, beat the drum" for 4 Voices, Chorus, and Strings (1678) (this piece is also referred to as the “Welcome Ode for James II”)
- Z. 336, Ode, "Swifter, Isis, swifter flow" (1681)
- Z. 337, Ode, "The summer's absence unconcerned we bear" (1682)
- Z. 338, Ode, "Welcome, welcome glorious morn" (1691)
- Z. 339, Ode, "Welcome to all the pleasures" (1683)
- Z. 340, Ode, "Welcome, vicegerent of the mighty king" (1680)
- Z. 341, Ode, "What, what shall be done in behalf of the man?" (1682)
- Z. 342, Ode, "Who can from joy refrain?" in C major, for Voices, Chorus, and Orchestra (1695) (this piece is also referred to as “A Birthday Song for the Duke of Gloucester”
- Z. 343, Ode, "Why, why are all the Muses mute?" (1685)
- Z. 344, Ode, "Ye tuneful Muses" (1686)

=== Songs ===
- Z. 351, Song, "Aaron thus propos'd to Moses" (1688) (Authorship Uncertain)
- Z. 352, Song, "Ah! Cruel nymph, you give despair" (Unknown)
- Z. 353, Song, "Ah! how pleasant 'tis to love" (1688)
- Z. 354, Song, "Ah! Cruel nymph, you give despair" (Unknown)
- Z. 355, Song, "Amidst the shades and cool refreshing streams" (1687)
- Z. 356, Song, "Amintas, to my grief I see" (1679)
- Z. 357, Song, "Amintor, heedless of his flocks" (1681)
- Z. 358, Song, "Ask me to love no more" (1694)
- Z. 359, Song, "A thousand sev'ral ways I tried" (1684)
- Z. 360, Song, "Bacchus is a power divine" (Unknown)
- Z. 361, Song, "Beware, poor Shepherds" (1684)
- Z. 362, Song, "Cease, anxious world" (1687)
- Z. 363, Song, "Cease, O my sad soul" (1678)
- Z. 364, Song, "Celia's fond, too long I've loved her" (1694)
- Z. 365, Song, "Corinna is divinely fair" (1692)
- Z. 367, Song, "Cupid, the slyest rogue alive" (1685)
- Z. 368, Song, "Farewell, all joys" (1685)
- Z. 369, Song, "Fly swift, ye hours" (1692)
- Z. 370, Song, "From silent shades and the Elysian groves" (1683)
- Z. 371, Song, "The Knotting Song" for Voice and Continuo (1695) (this piece is also referred to as “Hears not my Phyllis”)
- Z. 372, Song, "He himself courts his own ruin" (1684)
- Z. 373, Song, "How delightful's the life of an innocent swain" (Unknown)
- Z. 374, Song, "How I sigh when I think of the charms" (1681)
- Z. 375, Song, "I came, I saw, and was undone" (Unknown)
- Z. 376, Song, "I envy not a monarch's fate" (1693)
- Z. 377, Song, "I fain would be free" (Unknown)
- Z. 378, Song, "If grief has any power to kill" (1685)
- Z. 379, Song, "If music be the food of love" (1692–1695)
- Z. 380, Song, "If prayers and tears" (Unknown)
- Z. 381, Song, "I lov'd fair Celia" (1694)
- Z. 382, Song, "I love and I must" (Unknown)
- Z. 383, Song, "Incassum Lesbia, incassum rogas" (1695)
- Z. 384, Song, "In Cloris all soft charms" (1684)
- Z. 385, Song, "In vain we dissemble" (1685)
- Z. 386, Song, "I resolve against cringing" (1679)
- Z. 387, Song, "I saw that you were grown so high" (1678)
- Z. 388, Song, "I take no pleasure in the sun's bright beams" (1681)
- Z. 389, Song, "Leave these useless arts in loving" (Unknown)
- Z. 390, Song, "Let each gallant heart" (1683)
- Z. 391, Song, "Let formal lovers still pursue" (1687)
- Z. 392, Song, "Love arms himself in Celia's eyes" (Unknown)
- Z. 393, Song, "Love is now become a trade" (1685)
- Z. 394, Song, "Lovely Albina's come ashore" (Unknown)
- Z. 395, Song, "Love's power in my heart shall find no compliance" (1688)
- Z. 396, Song, "Love, thou canst hear, tho' thou art blind" (1695)
- Z. 397, Song, "More love or more disdain I crave" (1678)
- Z. 399, Song, "My heart, wherever you appear" (1685)
- Z. 400, Song, "Not all my torments can your pity move" (Unknown)
- Z. 401, Song, "No watch, dear Celia, just is found" (1693)
- Z. 402, Song, "O! fair Cedaria, hide those eyes" (Unknown)
- Z. 403, Song, "O! how happy's he" (1690)
- Z. 404, Song, "Olinda in the shades unseen" (Unknown)
- Z. 405, Song, "On the brow of Richmond Hill" (1692)
- Z. 406, Song, "O solitude, my sweetest choice" (1687)
- Z. 407, Song, "Pastora's beauties when unblown" (1681)
- Z. 408, Song, "Phyllis, I can ne'er forgive it" (1688)
- Z. 409, Song, "Phillis, talk no more of passion" (1685)
- Z. 410, Song, "Pious Celinda goes to prayers" (1695)
- Z. 411, Song, "Rashly I swore I would disown" (1683)
- Z. 412, Song, "Sawney is a bonny lad" (1694)
- Z. 413, Song, "She loves and she confesses too" (1683)
- Z. 414, Song, "She that would gain a faithful lover" (1695)
- Z. 415, Song, "She who my poor heart possesses" (1683)
- Z. 416, Song, "Since one poor view has drawn my heart" (1681)
- Z. 417, Song, "Spite of the godhead, pow'rful love" (1687)
- Z. 418, Song, "Sweet, be no longer sad" (1678)
- Z. 420, Song, "Sylvia, now your scorn give over" (1688)
- Z. 421, Song, "The fatal hour comes on apace" (Unknown)
- Z. 422, Song, "They say you're angry" (1685)
- Z. 423, Song, "This poet sings the Trojan wars" (1688)
- Z. 424, Song, "Through mournful shades and solitary groves" (1684)
- Z. 425, Song, "Turn then thine eyes" (Unknown)
- Z. 426, Song, "Urge me no more" (Unknown)
- Z. 427, Song, "We now, my Thyrsis, never find" (1693)
- Z. 428, Song, "What a sad fate is mine" (Unknown)
- Z. 429, Song, "What can we poor females do?" (1694)
- Z. 430, Song, "When first Amintas sued for a kiss" (1687)
- Z. 431, Song, "When first my shepherdess and I" (1687)
- Z. 432, Song, "When her languishing eyes said 'love'" (1681)
- Z. 433, Song, "When I a lover pale do see" (1678)
- Z. 434, Song, "When my Aemelia smiles" (Unknown)
- Z. 435, Song, "When Strephon found his passion vain" (1683)
- Z. 436, Song, "When Thyrsis did the splendid eye" (1675)
- Z. 437, Song, "While Thyrsis, wrapt in downy sleep" (1685)
- Z. 438, Song, "Whilst Cynthia sung, all angry winds lay still" (1686)
- Z. 440, Song, "Who but a slave can well express" (Unknown)
- Z. 441, Song, "Who can behold Florella's charms?" (1695)
- Z. 442, Song, "Why so serious, why so grave?" (Unknown)
- Z. 443, Song, "Ye happy swains, whose nymphs are kind" (1685)
- Z. 444, Song, "Stript of their green our groves appear" (1692)
- Z. 461, Song, "Beneath a dark and melancholy grove" (Unknown)
- Z. 462, Song, "Draw near, you lovers" (Unknown)
- Z. 463, Song, "Farewell, ye rocks" (1685)
- Z. 464, Song, "Gently shepherds, you that know" (1687)
- Z. 465, Song, "High on a throne of glitt'ring ore" (1690)
- Z. 466, Song, "Let us, kind Lesbia, give away" (1684)
- Z. 467, Song, "Musing on cares of human fate" (1685)
- Z. 468, Song, "No, to what purpose should I speak" (Unknown)
- Z. 469, Song, "Scarce had the rising sun appear'd" (1679)
- Z. 470, Song, "See how the fading glories of the year" (1689)
- Z. 471, Song, "Since the pox or the plague" (1679)
- Z. 472, Song, "What hope for us remains now he is gone?" (1679)
- Z. 473, Song, "Young Thyrsis' fate, ye hills and groves, deplore" (Unknown)
- Z. 482, Song, "Alas, how barbarous we are" (Unknown)
- Z. 483, Song, "Come, dear companions of th'Arcadian fields" (1686)
- Z. 484, Song, "Come, lay by all care" (1685)
- Z. 485, Song, "Dulcibella, when e'er I sue for a kiss" (1694)
- Z. 486, Song, "Fair Cloe, my breast so alarms" (1692)
- Z. 487, Song, "Fill the bowl with rosy wine" (1687)
- Z. 489, Song, "Go tell Amynta, gentle swain" (Unknown)
- Z. 490, Song, "Haste, gentle Charon" (Unknown)
- Z. 491, Song, "Has yet your breast no pity learn'd?" (1688)
- Z. 492, Song, "Hence, fond deceiver" (1687)
- Z. 493, Song, "Here's to thee, Dick" (1688)
- Z. 494, Song, "How great are the blessings 'A Health to King James'" (1686)
- Z. 495, Song, "How sweet is the air and refreshing" (1687)
- Z. 496, Song, "In all our Cynthia's shining sphere" (Unknown)
- Z. 497, Song, "In some kind dream" (1687)
- Z. 498, Song, "I saw fair Cloris all alone" (1687)
- Z. 499, Song, "I spy Celia, Celia eyes me" (1687)
- Z. 500, Song, "Julia, your unjust disdain" (1687)
- Z. 501, Song, "Let Hector, Achilles and each brave commander" (1689)
- Z. 502, Song, "Lost is my quiet forever" (1691)
- Z. 503, Song, "Nestor, who did to thrice man's age attain" (1689)
- Z. 504, Song, "O dive custos Auriacae domus" (1695)
- Z. 505, Song, "Oft am I by the women told" (1687)
- Z. 506, Song, "Oh! what a scene does entertain my sight" (Unknown)
- Z. 507, Song, "Saccharissa's grown old" (1686)
- Z. 508, Song, "See where she sits" (Unknown)
- Z. 509, Song, "Sit down, my dear Sylvia" (1685)
- Z. 510, Song, "Soft notes and gently raised" (1685)
- Z. 511, Song, "Sylvia, thou brighter eye of night" (Unknown)
- Z. 512, Song, "Sylvia, 'tis true you're fair" (1686)
- Z. 513, Song, "There never was so wretched lover as I" (Unknown)
- Z. 514, Song, "Though my mistress be fair" (1685)
- Z. 515, Song, "Trip it, trip it in a ring" (Unknown)
- Z. 516, Song, "Underneath this myrtle shade" (1692)
- Z. 517, Song, "Were I to choose the greatest bliss" (1689)
- Z. 518, Song, "What can we poor females do?" (Unknown)
- Z. 519, Song, "When gay Philander left the plain" (1684)
- Z. 520, Song, "When, lovely Phyllis, thou art kind" (1685)
- Z. 521, Song, "When Myra sings" (1695)
- Z. 522, Song, "When Teucer from his father fled" (1686)
- Z. 523, Song, "While bolts and bars my days control" (Unknown)
- Z. 524, Song, "While you for me alone had charms" (Unknown)
- Z. 525, Song, "Why, my Daphne, why complaining?" (1691)
- Z. 541, Song, "Hark Damon, hark" (Unknown)
- Z. 542, Song, "Hark how the wild musicians sing" (Unknown)
- Z. 543, Song, "How pleasant is this flowery plain" (1688)
- Z. 544, Song, "If ever I more riches did desire" (Unknown)
- Z. 545, Song, "In a deep vision's intellectual scene 'The Complaint'" (Unknown)
- Z. 546, Song, "'Tis wine was made to rule the day" (Unknown)
- Z. 547, Song, "We reap all the pleasures" (Unknown)

=== Theatre music [Z. 570–613] ===
- Z. 570, Incidental Music, Abdelazer or The Moor's Revenge (1695)
  - I. Overture
  - Suite
    - II. Rondeau
    - III. Air
    - IV. Air
    - V. Minuet
    - VI. Air
    - VII. Jig
    - VIII. Hornpipe
    - IX. Air
  - X. Song, "Lucinda is bewitching fair"
- Z. 571, Incidental Music, A Fool's Preferment or The Three Dukes of Dunstable (1688)
  - I. Song, "I sigh'd, and I pin'd"
  - II. Song, "There's nothing so fatal as woman"
  - III. Song, "Fled is my love"
  - IV. Song, "'Tis death alone"
  - V. Song, "I'll mount to yon blue Coelum"
  - VI. Song, "I'll sail upon the Dog-star"
  - VII. Song, "Jenny, 'gin you can love"
  - VIII. Song, "If thou wilt give me back my love"
- Z. 572, Incidental Music, Amphitryon or The Two Sosias (1690) – [Movement numbers III–IX are not authoritative, there is a lost movement between movements II and XI]
  - I. Overture
  - II. Saraband
  - III. Song, "Celia, that I once was blest"
  - IV. Hornpipe
  - V. Scotch tune
  - VI. Song, "For Iris I sigh"
  - VII. Air
  - VIII. Minuet
  - IX. Hornpipe
  - XI. Song, "Fair Iris and her swain"
  - XII. Bourrée
- Z. 573, Incidental Music, Aureng-Zebe or The Great Mogul (1692)
  - I. Song, "I see, she flies me"
- Z. 574, Incidental Music, Bonduca or The British Heroine (1695) – [Movement numbers II–VII are not authoritative, there are two lost movements between movements I and X]
  - I. Overture
  - Suite
    - II. Air
    - III. Hornpipe
    - IV. Air
    - V. Hornpipe
    - VI. Air
    - VII. Minuet
  - X. Catch, "Jack, thou'rt a toper"
  - XI. Prelude and Song, "Hear us great Rugwith"
  - XII. Song, "Hear, ye Gods of Britain"
  - XIII. Song, "Sing, sing, ye Druids"
  - XIV. Song, "Divine Andate, president of war"
  - XV. Symphony and Song, "To arms"
  - XVI. Prelude and Song, "Britons strike home!"
  - XVII. Prelude and Song, "O lead me to some peaceful gloom"
- Z. 575, Incidental Music, Circe (1690)
  - I. Prelude and Song, "We must assemble by a sacrifice"
  - II. Song, "Their necessary aid you use"
  - III. Song, "Come every demon"
  - IV. Song, "Lovers, who to their first embraces go"
  - V. Song, "Magician's Dance"
  - VI. Song, "Pluto arise!"
- Z. 576, Incidental Music, Cleomenes, the Spartan Hero (1692)
  - I. Song, "No, no, poor suff'ring heart"
- Z. 577, Incidental Music, Distressed Innocence or The Princess of Persia (1694) – [There are two alternative movement listings for the Suite]
  - I. Overture
  - Suite
    - II. Air (or Jig)
    - III. Slow Air (or Rondeau)
    - IV. Air
    - V. Hornpipe (or Minuet)
- Z. 578, Incidental Music, Don Quixote (1694–95)
  - I. Song, "Sing all ye Muses"
  - II. Song, "When the world first knew creation"
  - III. Song, "Let the dreadful engines"
  - IV. Prelude
  - V. Song, "With this sacred charming wand"
  - VI. Song, "Since times are so bad"
  - VII. Prelude and Song, "Genius of England"
  - VIII. Song, "Lads and Lasses, blith and gay"
  - IX. Song, "From rosie bow'rs"
- Z. 579, Incidental Music, Epsom Wells (1693)
  - I. Song, "Leave these useless arts"
- Z. 580, Incidental Music, Henry the Second, King of England (1692)
  - I. Song, "In vain, 'gainst Love, in vain I strove"
- Z. 581, Incidental Music, The History of King Richard the Second or The Sicilian Usurper (1681)
  - I. Song, "Retir'd from any mortal's sight"
- Z. 582, Incidental Music, Love Triumphant or Nature Will Prevail (1693)
  - I. Song, "How happy's the husband"
- Z. 583, Incidental Music, Oedipus (1692)
  - I. Prelude and Song, "Hear, ye sullen powers below"
  - II. Song, "Music for a while"
  - III. Song, "Come away, do not stay"
  - IV. Song, "Laius! Hear, hear"
- Z. 584, Incidental Music, Oroonoko (1695)
  - I. Song, "Celemene, pray tell me"
- Z. 585, Incidental Music, Pausanias, the Betrayer of his Country (1695)
  - I. Song, "Sweeter than roses"
  - II. Song, "My dearest, my fairest"
- Z. 586, Incidental Music, Regulus or The Faction of Carthage (1692)
  - I. Song, "Ah me! to many deaths"
- Z. 587, Incidental Music, Rule a Wife and Have a Wife (1693)
  - I. Song, "There's not a swain"
- Z. 588, Incidental Music, Sir Anthony Love or The Rambling Lady (1692)
  - I. Overture
  - II. Prelude and Song, "Pursuing Beauty"
  - III. Song, "No more, Sir, no more"
  - IV. Song, "In vain Clemene"
  - V. Ground
- Z. 589, Incidental Music, Sir Barnaby Whigg or No Wit Like a Woman's (1681)
  - I. Song, "Blow, blow, Boreas, blow"
- Z. 590, Incidental Music, Sophonisba or Hannibal's Overthrow (1685)
  - I. Song, "Beneath the poplar's shadow"
- Z. 591, Incidental Music, The Canterbury Guests or A Bargain Broken (1694)
  - I. Song, "Good neighbor why?"
- Z. 592, Incidental Music, The Double Dealer (1693)
  - I. Overture
  - Suite
    - II. Hornpipe
    - III. Minuet
    - IV. Air
    - V. Hornpipe
    - VI. Minuet
    - VII. Minuet
    - VIII. Air
    - IX. Air
  - X. Song, "Cynthia frowns"
- Z. 594, Incidental Music, The English Lawyer (1685)
  - I. Catch, "My wife has a tongue"
- Z. 595, Incidental Music, The Fatal Marriage or The Innocent Adultery (1694)
  - I. Song, "The danger is over"
  - II. Song, "I sigh'd and owned my love"
- Z. 596, Incidental Music, The Female Virtuosos (1693)
  - I. Song, "Love, thou art best"
- Z. 597, Incidental Music, The Gordian Knot Unty'd (1691) – [The movement numbers for the Suite are not authoritative, there is a lost movement from it]
  - I. Overture
  - Suite
    - II. Air
    - III. Rondeau Minuet
    - IV. Air
    - V. Jig
    - VI. Chaconne
    - VII. Air
    - VIII. Minuet
- Z. 598, Incidental Music, The Indian Emperor or The Conquest of Mexico (1691)
  - I. Song, "I look'd and saw within"
- Z. 599, Incidental Music, The Knight of Malta (1691)
  - I. Catch, "At the close of the ev'ning"
- Z. 600, Incidental Music, The Libertine or The Libertine Destroyed (1692)
  - I. Song, "Nymphs and Shepherds/We come"
  - II. Prelude and Song, "Prepare, prepare, new guests draw near"
  - III. Prelude and Song, "To arms, heroic prince"
- Z. 601, Incidental Music, The Maid's Last Prayer or Any Rather Than Fail (1693)
  - I. Song, "Though you make no return"
  - II. Song, "No, resistance is but vain"
  - III. Song, "Tell me no more"
- Z. 602, Incidental Music, The Marriage-hater Match'd (1693)
  - I. Song, "As soon as the chaos"
  - II. Song, "How vile are the sordid intregues"
- Z. 603, Incidental Music, The Married Beau or The Curious Impertinent (1694)
  - I. Overture
  - Suite
    - II. Slow Air
    - III. Hornpipe
    - IV. Air
    - V. Hornpipe
    - VI. Jig
    - VII. Trumpet Air
    - VIII. March
    - IX. Hornpipe on a ground
  - X. Song, "See! where repenting Celia lyes"
- Z. 604, Incidental Music, The Massacre of Paris (1693)
  - I. Song, "Thy genius, lo"
- Z. 605, Incidental Music, The Mock Marriage (1695)
  - I. Song, "Oh! how you protest"
  - II. Song, "'Twas within a furlong"
  - III. Song, "Man is for the woman made"
- Z. 606, Incidental Music, Theodosius or The Force of Love (1680)
  - I. Song, "Prepare, prepare, the rites begin"
  - II. Song, "Can'st thou, Marina"
  - III. Song, "The gate to bliss"
  - IV. Prelude and Song "Hark! Hark! behold the heav'nly choir"
  - V. Song, "Now the fight's done"
  - VI. Song, "Sad as death at dead of night"
  - VII. Song, "Dream no more of pleasures past"
  - VIII. Song, "Hail to the myrtle shade"
  - IX. Song, "Ah cruel, bloody fate"
- Z. 607, Incidental Music, The Old Bachelor (1691)
  - I. Overture
  - Suite
    - II. Hornpipe
    - III. Slow Air
    - IV. Hornpipe
    - V. Rondeau
    - VI. Menuet
    - VII. Boree
    - VIII. March
    - IX. Jig
  - X. Song, "Thus to a ripe, consenting maid"
  - XI. Song, "As Amoret and Thyrsis lay"
- Z. 608, Incidental Music, The Richmond Heiress or A Woman Once in the Right (1691) – [Movements II and III lost, both Songs, titles unknown]
  - I. Song, "Behold the man"
- Z. 609, Incidental Music, The Rival Sisters or The Violence of Love (1695) – [The Suite is lost]
  - I. Overture
  - Suite (Movements II–IX)
  - X. Song, "Celia has a thousand charms"
  - XI. Song, "Take not a woman's anger ill"
  - XII. Song, "How happy, how happy is she"
- Z. 610, Incidental Music, The Spanish Friar or The Double Discovery (1694–95)
  - I. Song, "Whilst I with grief"
- Z. 611, Incidental Music, The Virtuous Wife or Good Luck at Last (1694) – [One of the movements in the Suite is lost]
  - I. Overture
  - Suite
    - II. Song tune
    - III. Slow Air
    - IV. Air
    - V. Preludio
    - VI. Hornpipe
    - VII. Minuet
    - VIII. Minuet
- Z. 612, Incidental Music, The Wives' Excuse or Cuckolds Make Themselves (1691)
  - I. Song, "Ingrateful love!"
  - II. Song, "Hang this whining way of wooing"
  - III. Song, "Say, cruel Amoret"
  - IV. Song, "Corinna, I excuse thy face"
- Z. 613, Incidental Music, Tyrannic Love or The Royal Martyr (1694)
  - I. Song, "Hark! my Damilcar!"
  - II. Song, "Ah! how sweet it is to love"

=== Operas [Z. 626–632] ===
- Z. 626, Opera, Dido and Aeneas (by 1688)
  - I. Overture
  - Act 1
    - IIa. Aria, "Shake the cloud from off your brow"
    - IIb. Chorus, "Banish sorrow, banish care"
    - III. Aria and Ritornello, "Ah! Belinda, I am prest with torment"
    - IV. Duet (dialogue), "Grief increases by concealing"
    - V. Chorus, "When monarchs unite"
    - VI. Trio (dialogue), "Whence could so much virtue spring?"
    - VII. Duet and Chorus, "Fear no danger"
    - VIII. Trio (dialogue), "See, your royal guest appears"
    - IX. Chorus (dialogue), Cupid only throws the dart"
    - X. Aria, "If not for mine"
    - XI. Prelude and Aria, "Pursue thy conquest, love"
    - XII. Chorus, "To the hills and the vales"
    - XIII. Dance – The triumphing dance
  - Act 2
    - XIV. Prelude and Aria, "Wayward sisters"
    - XV. Chorus, "Harm's our delight"
    - XVI. Aria, "The queen of Carthage, whom we hate"
    - XVII–XX. Chorus and Dialogue, "Ho ho ho!"
    - XXI. Chorus, "In our deep vaulted cell"
    - XXII. "Echo dance of the furies"
    - XXIII. Ritornello
    - XXIVa – b. Aria and Chorus, "Thanks to these lonesome vales"
    - XXIVc. Dance – Gittar ground
    - XXVa. Aria, "Oft she visits this lone mountain"
    - XXVb. Ritornello, "A Dance to entertain Aeneas by Dido's Women"
    - XXVI. Aria, "Behold, upon my bended spear"
    - XXVII. Aria and Chorus, "Haste, haste to town"
    - XXVIII. Duet (dialogue), "Stay, Prince"
  - Act 3
    - XXIX. Prelude and Aria, "Come away, fellow sailors"
    - XXX. Dance – The sailor's dance
    - XXXI. Trio (dialogue), "See the flags and the streamers curling"
    - XXXII. Aria, "Our next motion"
    - XXXIII. Chorus, " Destruction's our delight"
    - XXXIV. Dance – The witches' dance
    - XXXVa. Aria, "Your counsel all is urg'd in vain"
    - XXXVb. Trio (dialogue), "See, madam where the Prince appears"
    - XXXVI. Chorus, "Great minds against themselves conspire"
    - XXXVII. Aria, "Thy hand Belinda, darkness shades me"
    - XXXVIII. Ground, Aria and Ritornello, "When I am laid in earth"
    - XXXIX. Chorus, "With drooping wings"
    - XL. Epilogue, "All that we know the angels do above"
- Z. 627, Semi-Opera, Prophetess or The History of Dioclesian or Dioclesian (1690)
  - I. 1st Music
  - II. 2nd Music
  - III. Overture
  - IV. 1st Act Tune (Hornpipe)
  - Act 2
    - V. Prelude, Aria and Chorus, "Great Diocles the boar has killed"
    - VI. Prelude and Aria, "Charon, the peaceful shade invites"
    - VII. Symphony
    - VIII. Duet and Chorus, "Let all mankind the pleasures share"
    - IX. Prelude, Aria and Chorus, "Let the soldier's rejoice"
    - X. Ritornello
    - XI. Trio and Chorus, "To Mars let 'em raise"
    - XII. Ritornello
    - XIIIa. Prelude – A Symphony of flutes in the air
    - XIIIb – c. Aria and Chorus, "Since the toils and hazards of war"
    - XIIId. Aria and Ritornello, "With dances and songs"
    - XIIIe. Quartet and Chorus, "Let the priests with processions"
    - XIV. Dance of the Furies
    - XV. 2nd Act Tune
  - Act 3
    - XVI. Chaconne (Two in one upon a Ground)
    - XVI (App 1). Aria, "When first I saw"
    - XVII. Dance – The Chair Dance
    - XVIII. Prelude and Aria, "What shall I do"
    - XIX. 3rd Act Tune
  - Act 4
    - XX. Dance – Butterfly Dance
    - XXI. Trumpet Tune
    - XXII–XXIII. Aria and Chorus, "Sound Fame"
    - XXIV. 4th Act Tune
  - Act 5
    - XXV. Dance – Country Dance
    - XXVI. Prelude and Masque, "Call the Nymphs and the fauns"
    - XXVII. Duet, "Come, come away"
  - First Entry
    - XXVIII. Prelude and Chorus, "Behold, O mightiest of gods"
    - XXIX. Paspe
    - XXX. Duet, "O, the sweet delights of love"
    - XXXI. Aria and Chorus, "Let monarchs fight"
    - XXXI (App 2). Aria, "Since from my dear Astrea's sight"
  - Second Entry
    - XXXIIa. Prelude
    - XXXIIb. Duet, "Make room for the great god of wine"
    - XXXIIc. Chorus, "I'm here with my jolly crew"
    - XXXIId. Dance – Dance of the Baccanals
    - XXXIII. Aria and Ritornello, "Still I'm wishing"
  - Third Entry
    - XXXIV. "Canaries"
    - XXXV. Duet (dialogue), "Tell me why my charming fair"
  - Fourth Entry
    - XXXVI. Dance
    - XXXVII. Aria and Chorus, "All our days"
    - XXXVII (App 3). Aria, "Let us dance"
    - XXXVIII. Trio, "Triumph, victorious love"
    - XXXIX. Chorus
- Z. 628, Semi-Opera, King Arthur or The British Worthy (1691)
  - I. 1st Music
  - II. 2nd Music
  - III. Air
  - IV. Overture
  - V. Prelude and Aria, "Woden, first to thee"
  - VI. Aria, "The white horse"
  - VII – VIII. Prelude, Aria and Chorus, "Brave Souls"
  - IX. Aria, "I call ye all to Woden's hall"
  - X. Symphony, Aria and Chorus, "Come if you dare"
  - XI. 1st Act Tune
  - Act 2
    - XII. Prelude and Aria, "Hither this way bend"
    - XIII. Aria, Ritornello, "Let not a moon-born Elf"
    - XIV. Dialogue and Chorus, "Come follow me"
    - XV. Dance, Aria and Chorus, "How blest are Shepherds"
    - XVI. Symphony and Duet (dialogue), "Shepherd, leave decoying"
    - XVII. Chorus and Hornpipe, "Come Shepherds"
    - XVIII. 2nd Act Tune
  - Act 3
    - XIX. Prelude and Aria, "What ho"
    - XX. Prelude and Aria, "What power art thou"
    - XXI. Aria, "Thou doting fool forbear"
    - XXII. Aria, "Great love"
    - XXIII. Aria, "No part"
    - XXIV. Prelude, Chorus and Dance, "See, see"
    - XXV. Aria, Ritornello and Chorus, "Tis I, that have warm'd ye"
    - XXVI. Prelude and Duet, "Sound a Parley"
    - XXVII. Aria, Ritornello and Chorus, "Tis I, that have warm'd ye"
    - XXVIII. 3rd Act Tune (Air)
  - Act 4 (Scene 2)
    - XXIX. Duet, "Two Daughters"
    - XXXa. Passacaglia
    - XXXb–d. Aria, Ritornello and Chorus, "How happy the Lover"
    - XXXe–i. Dialogue and Chorus, "No, no joy"
    - XXXI. 4th Act Tune
  - Act 5 (Scene 2)
    - XXXIIa. Prelude (Trumpet Tune)
    - XXXIIb–c. Aria, "Ye Blust'ring Brethren"
    - XXXIII. Symphony
    - XXXIV. Duet and Chorus, "Round thy coasts"
    - XXXVa. Aria, "You say tis love"
    - XXXVb–c. Aria and Chorus, "This not my passion"
    - XXXVd–e. Aria and Chorus, "But one soft moment"
    - XXXVI. Duet, "For folded flocks"
    - XXXVII. Aria and Chorus, "Your hay is mown"
    - XXXVIII. Aria, "Fairest Isle"
    - XXXIX. Chorus, "St George"
    - XL. 5th Act Tune (Chaconne)
- Z. 629, Semi-Opera, The Fairy-Queen (1692)
  - I. 1st Music (Prelude and Hornpipe)
  - II. 2nd Music (Air and Rondeau)
  - III. Overture (Grave and Canzona)
  - Act 1
    - IV. Prelude and Aria, "Come, come, come, let us leave the town"
    - V. Prelude, Aria and Chorus, "Fill up the bowl!"
    - VI. 1st Act Tune (Jig)
  - Act 2
    - VII. Prelude and Aria, "Come all ye songsters of the sky"
    - VIIIa. Prelude
    - VIIIb. Trio, "May the god of wit inspire"
    - VIIIc. Echo
    - IX. Chorus, "Now joyn your warbling voices all"
    - Xa–b. Aria and Chorus, "Sing while we trip it on the green"
    - Xc. A dance of the fairies
    - XI. Prelude and Aria, "See even Night herself is here"
    - XII. Aria, "I am come to lock all fast"
    - XIII. Prelude and Aria, "One charming night"
    - XIV. Aria and Chorus, "Hush, no more, be silent all"
    - XV. Dance – A dance for the followers of the night
    - XVI. 2nd Act Tune (Air)
  - Act 3
    - XVII. Prelude, Aria and Chorus, "If love's a sweet passion"
    - XVIII. Overture – Symphony while the swans come forward
    - XIX. Dance – Dance for the fairies
    - XX. Dance – Dance for the green men
    - XXI. Aria, "Ye gentle spirits of the air appear"
    - XXII. Aria, "Now the maids and the men"
    - XXIII. Aria, "When I have often heard"
    - XXIVa. Dance – A dance of haymakers
    - XXIVb. Dance – Dance for a clown
    - XXV. Aria and Chorus, "A thousand thousand ways we'll find"
    - XXVI. 3rd Act Tune (Hornpipe)
  - Act 4
    - XXVII. Symphony – Sonata while the sun rises
    - XXVIII. Aria and Chorus, "Now the night is chas'd away"
    - XXIX. Duet, "Let the fifes, and the clarions"
    - XXX. Entry of Phoebus
    - XXXI. Prelude and Aria, "When a cruel long winter"
    - XXXII. Chorus, "Hail! Great parent of us all"
    - XXXIII. Prelude and Aria, "Thus the ever grateful spring"
    - XXXIV. Prelude and Aria, "Here's the summer, sprightly, gay"
    - XXXV. Prelude and Aria, "See my many colour'd fields"
    - XXXVI. Prelude and Aria, "Next, winter comes slowly"
    - XXXVII. Chorus, "Hail! Great parent of us all"
    - XXXVIII. 4th Act Tune (Air)
  - Act 5
    - XXXIXa. Prelude to Juno's song
    - XXXIXb–c. Aria, "Thrice happy lovers"
    - XL. Aria, "O let me weep"
    - XLI. Dance – Entry dance
    - XLII. Symphony
    - XLIII. Aria, "Thus the gloomy world st first began to shine"
    - XLIV. Prelude, Aria and Chorus, "Thus happy and free"
    - XLV. Ground and Aria, "Yes, Daphne, in your looks I find"
    - XLVI. Dance – Monkey's dance
    - XLVII. Prelude and Aria, "Hark how all things in one sound agree"
    - XLVIII. Aria and Chorus, "Hark! Now the echoing air"
    - XLIX. Duet and Chorus, "Sure the dull god of marriage"
    - La. Prelude
    - Lb. Aria, "See, see, I obey"
    - Lc. Duet, "Turn then thine eyes"
    - Ld. Aria, "My torch, indeed will from such brightness shine"
    - Le–f. Trio, "They shall be as happy
    - LI. Chaconne – Dance for the Chinese man and woman
- Z. 630, Semi-Opera, The Indian Queen (1695)
  - I. 1st Music, (Air and Hornpipe)
  - II. 2nd Music, (Air and Hornpipe)
  - III. Overture, (Grave and Canzon)
  - Prologue
    - IVa. Trumpet Tune
    - IVb. Aria, "Wake Quivera, wake"
    - IVc. Prelude
    - IVd. Aria, "Why should men quarrel"
  - Act 2
    - V. Symphony
    - VI. Aria and Chorus, "I come to sing great Zempoalla's story"
    - VII. Trio, "What flatt'ring noise is this"
    - VIII. Trumpet tune
    - IX. Symphony
    - X. Dance
    - XI. 2nd Act Music (Trumpet Tune reprise)
  - Act 3
    - XII. Dance
    - XIII. Aria, "Ye twice ten hundred deities"
    - XIV. Symphony
    - XV. Aria, "Seek not to know what must not be reveal'd"
    - XVI. Trumpet Overture (Canzon and Adagio)
    - XVIIa. Duet and Quartet, "Ah! Ah! How happy are we!"
    - XVIII. 3rd Act Tune (Rondeau)
    - XIX. Aria, "They tell us that you mighty powers above"
    - XX. 4th Act Tune
    - XXIa. Prelude and Chorus, "While thus we bow before your shrine"
    - XXIb. Aria, "You who at the altar stand"
    - XXIc. Prelude
    - XXId. Chorus, "All dismal sounds thus on these off'rings wait"
    - XXII. Air
- Z. 631, Semi-Opera, The Tempest or The Enchanted Island (c. 1695)
  - I. Overture (Grave and Canzon)
  - Act 2
    - II. Duet (dialogue) and Chorus, "Where does the black fiend Ambition reside"
    - III. Prelude and Aria, "Arise, ye subterranean winds"
    - IV. Dance
  - Act 3
    - V. Aria and Chorus, "Come unto these yellow sands"
    - VI. Prelude, Aria and Chorus, "Full fathom five"
    - VII. Aria and Ritornello, "Dry those eyes"
    - VIII. Prelude and Aria, "Kind fortune smiles"
  - Act 4
    - IX. Dance – Dance of devils
    - X. Aria, "Dear pretty youth"
  - Act 5
    - XIa. Recitative, "Great Neptune!"
    - XIb–d. Aria and Ritornello, "Fair and serene"
    - XII. Chorus and Ritornello, "The Nereids and the Tritons"
    - XIII. Aria, "Aeolus, you must appear"
    - XIV. Aria, "Your awful voice I hear"
    - XV. Prelude and Aria, "Halcyon days"
    - XVI. Prelude and Aria, "See, see, the heavens smile"
    - XVII. Duet and Chorus, "No stars again shall hurt you"

- Z. 632, Semi-Opera, Timon of Athens (1695)
  - I. Overture
  - The Masque
    - II. Duet, "Hark! how the songsters of the grove"
    - III. Aria, "Love in their little veins inspires"
    - IV. Trio, "But ah! how much are our delights"
    - V. Aria, "Hence! Hence! Hence with your trifling deity"
    - VI. Chorus, "But over us no griefs prevail"
    - VII. Aria, "Come all to me"
    - VIII. Chorus, "Who can resist such mighty, mighty charms"
    - IX. Aria, "Return, revolting rebels"
    - X. Aria, "The cares of lovers"
    - XI. Aria, Love quickly is pall'd"
    - XII. Duet and Chorus, "Come, let us agree"
    - XIII. Curtain Tune on a Ground

=== Instrumental Works [Z. 641–860] ===
- Z. 641, Air in G major (Unknown)
- Z. 642, Almand and Corant in A minor (Unknown)
- Z. 644, Corant in G major (Unknown)
- Z. 645, Ground on Gamut in G major (Unknown)
- Z. 646, A New Irish Tune in G major (1687)
- Z. 647, March in C major (1687)
- Z. 648, March in C major (1687)
- Z. 649, Minuet in A minor (1687)
- Z. 650, Minuet in A minor (1687)
- Z. 651, Minuet in G major (Unknown)
- Z. 652, Prelude in A minor (Unknown)
- Z. 653, Rigadoon in C major (1687)
- Z. 654, Saraband in A minor (Unknown)
- Z. 655, A New Scotch Tune in G major (1687)
- Z. 656, Sefauchi's Farewell in D minor (1687)
- Z. 660, Suite in G major (1696)
- Z. 661, Suite in G minor (1696)
- Z. 662, Suite in G major (1696)
- Z. 663, Suite in A minor (1696)
- Z. 665, Suite in C major (1687)
- Z. 666, Suite in C major (1696)
- Z. 667, Suite in D major (1696)
- Z. 668, Suite in D minor (1696)
- Z. 669, Suite in F major (1696)
- Z. 670, The Queen's Dolour in A minor (Unknown)
- Z. 716, Verse in F major (Unknown)
- Z. 717, Voluntary in C major (Unknown)
- Z. 718, Voluntary in D minor (for one-manual organ, c. 1690)
- Z. 719, Voluntary in D minor (for double, i.e. two-manual, organ, c. 1690)
- Z. 720, Voluntary in G major (Unknown)
- Z. 721, Voluntary in A major on the 100th Psalm (Unknown)
- Fantasies and In nomines (1680)
  - Z. 730, Chacony in G minor
  - Z. 731, Fantasy upon a Ground in D major/F major
  - Z. 732, Fantasy in D minor
  - Z. 733, Fantasy in F major
  - Z. 734, Fantasy in G minor
  - Z. 735, Fantasy in G minor
  - Z. 736, Fantasy in B♭ major
  - Z. 737, Fantasy in F major
  - Z. 738, Fantasy in C minor
  - Z. 739, Fantasy in D minor
  - Z. 740, Fantasy in A minor
  - Z. 741, Fantasy in E minor
  - Z. 742, Fantasy in G major
  - Z. 743, Fantasy in D minor
  - Z. 744, Fantasy in A minor (incomplete)
  - Z. 745, Fantasy upon One Note in F major
  - Z. 746, In Nomine in G minor
  - Z. 747, In Nomine, Dorian, in G minor
- Z. 748, Pavan in A major (1680)
- Z. 749, Pavan in A minor (1680)
- Z. 750, Pavan in B♭ major (1680)
- Z. 751, Pavan in G minor (1680)
- Z. 752, Pavan in G minor (1680)
- Z. 770, Overture in G minor (1680) – [This Z number is shared by a Suite in G major]
- Z. 771, Overture in D minor (Unknown)
- Z. 772, Overture in G minor (Unknown)
- Z. 780, Trio Sonata in G minor (Unknown)
- Twelve Sonatas in Three Parts (c. 1680)
  - Z. 790, Trio Sonata in G minor
  - Z. 791, Trio Sonata in B♭ major
  - Z. 792, Trio Sonata in D minor
  - Z. 793, Trio Sonata in F major
  - Z. 794, Trio Sonata in A minor
  - Z. 795, Trio Sonata in C major
  - Z. 796, Trio Sonata in E minor
  - Z. 797, Trio Sonata in G major
  - Z. 798, Trio Sonata in C minor
  - Z. 799, Trio Sonata in A major
  - Z. 800, Trio Sonata in F minor
  - Z. 801, Trio Sonata in D major
- Ten Sonatas in Four Parts (c. 1680)
  - Z. 802, Trio Sonata in B minor
  - Z. 803, Trio Sonata in E♭ major
  - Z. 804, Trio Sonata in A minor
  - Z. 805, Trio Sonata in D minor
  - Z. 806, Trio Sonata in G minor
  - Z. 807, Trio Sonata in G minor
  - Z. 808, Trio Sonata in C major
  - Z. 809, Trio Sonata in G minor
  - Z. 810, Trio Sonata in F major (sometimes called "The Golden Sonata")
  - Z. 811, Trio Sonata in D major
- Z. 850, Trumpet Sonata in D major (1694)

=== Funeral Sentences and Music for the Funeral of Queen Mary [Z. 860] ===
- Z. 860, Music for the Funeral of Queen Mary: March and Canzona (1695)
- Z. 860/Z. 27/Z. 17/Z. 58c, Funeral Sentences

=== Works with non-standard Z number [ZD-ZT] ===
- ZD 4, Verse Anthem, "O god, they that love thy name" (Unknown)
- ZD 171, Song, "A Poor blind woman" (Unknown)
- ZD 172, Song, "When the cock begins to crow" (Unknown)
- ZD 221, Keyboard Ground in C minor (Unknown)
- ZD 222, Keyboard Ground in D minor (Unknown)
- ZD 201, Song, "When night her purple veil had softly spread" (Unknown)
- ZN 66, Verse Anthem, "If the Lord himself" (Unknown)
- ZN 773, Keyboard Prelude in G minor/D minor (Unknown)
- ZS 69, Song, "Sweet tyranness, I now resign" (1667)
- ZS 70, Song, "Sweet tyranness, I now resign" (1678) – [Solo version of ZS 69]

Note: All the following are keyboard works

- ZT 675, Air in D minor (Unknown)
- ZT 676, Air in D minor (Unknown)
- ZT 677, Canary in B♭ major (Unknown)
- ZT 678, Trumpet Tune in C major (1696)
- ZT 680, Chaconne in G minor (1696)

"A New Ground", ZT 682
Contemporary arrangement

- ZT 681, Ground in C minor (Unknown)
- ZT 682, A New Ground in E minor (1687)
- ZT 683, Hornpipe in B♭ major (Unknown)
- ZT 684, Hornpipe in D minor (Unknown)
- ZT 685, Hornpipe in E minor (Unknown)
- ZT 686, Jig in G minor (1696)
- ZT 687, March in C major (1696)
- ZT 688, Minuet in D minor (1687)
- ZT 689, Minuet in D minor (1687)
- ZT 690, Overture in C minor (Unknown)
- ZT 691, Overture in D major (Unknown)
- ZT 692, Overture in D major (Unknown)
- ZT 693/1, Overture in G minor (Unknown)
- ZT 693/2, Air in G minor (Unknown)
- ZT 694, Song Tune in C major (1687)
- ZT 695, Song Tune in C major (1687)
- ZT 696/1, Air in D minor (Unknown) – [2nd version of ZT 675]
- ZT 696/2, Air in D minor (Unknown)
- ZT 697, Trumpet Tune in C major (1696)
- ZT 698, Trumpet Tune in C major (1696)

=== Works without Z number ===
- Full Anthem, "I was glad when they said unto me" (originally attributed to John Blow) (1685)
- Keyboard Air in F
- Keyboard Prelude in C (attributed to Purcell)
- Keyboard Voluntary (attributed to Purcell)
