= Ode to St. Cecilia =

Ode to St. Cecilia may refer to:

- Hail! Bright Cecilia, a 1692 composition by Henry Purcell
- Welcome to All the Pleasures, a 1683 composition by Henry Purcell
