= Alexander Damascene =

Alexander Damascene (born, mid-17th century - died, 14 July 1719) was English countertenor of French birth.

== Life ==
Born sometime in the mid-17th century, Damascene's parents were of Italian ancestry. He was born in France, and came to England where he married Honor Powell on 22 July 1680 at St Matthew Friday Street. In his letters of denization dated 22 July 1682 he was described as a French Protestant. It is speculated that he came to England because of his Protestant background. He was active as a composer with his earliest compositions being songs published in the collections Choice Ayres and Songs (1684),The Theater of Music (1685-1687), Comes amoris (1687-1688, and 1693-1694), and The Banquet of Musick (1688–1692).

Damascene made his living as a singer and music teacher. A countertenor, he was appointed to the "King's Vocall Musick" and made "composer in his Majesty’s private musick in ordinary" in 1689. He was a singer in the choir of the Chapel Royal (CR), and sang at the coronation of William III and Mary II on 11 April 1689. From 1690 onwards he performed solos in most of the odes composed by Henry Purcell for the English court; beginning with the ode, Arise, my Muse (1690) which was composed for Queen Mary's birthday. One of the other odes he performed in at its premiere was Hail! Bright Cecilia (1692).

While Damascene was appointed " gentleman-extraordinary" at the CR on 6 December 1690, he did obtain a full-time post at the CR until 1695 when he succeeded Purcell (who had died) as gentleman-in-ordinary. He officially assumed that post on 10 December 1695, and remained in that role until his death nearly 24 years later. In 1702 he sang at the coronation of Queen Anne. He continued to compose songs which were published in the collections Vinculum societatis (1691), the Gentleman's Journal (1692–1694), and Pills to Purge Melancholy (1707–1720).

He lived (as stated in his will) in the Parish of St Anne's in London. He died on 14 July 1719, and was buried at St Anne's Church, Soho. He left his estate to Sarah Powell, his daughter-in-law.
