= Remember not, Lord, our offences =

Choral anthem by Henry Purcell

- Anthem by Henry Purcell
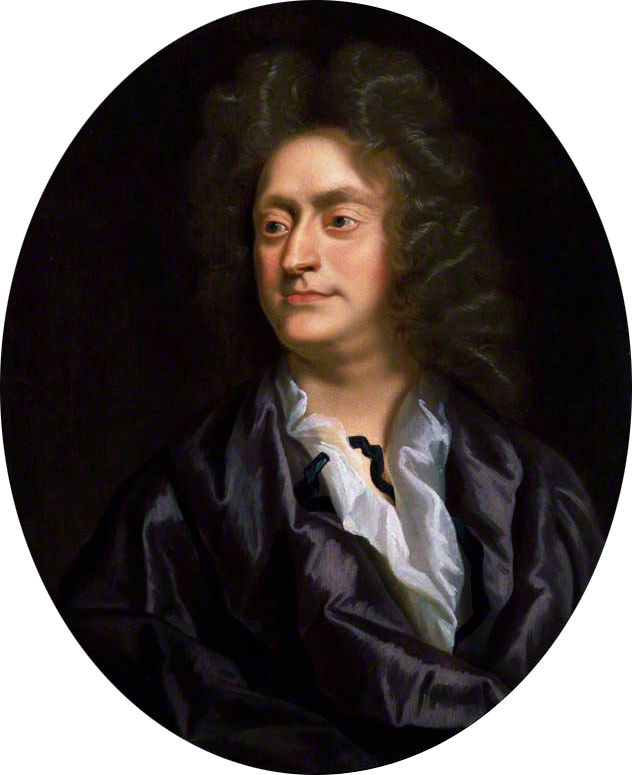
- Portrait of the composer by John Closterman, 1695
- Key: A minor
- Catalogue: Z.50
- Genre: Sacred choral music
- Text: Excerpt from the Litany from Book of Common Prayer
- Composed: c. 1679–1682
- Scoring: SSATB choir, optional continuo

"Remember not, Lord, our offences", Z.50, is a five-part choral anthem by the English baroque composer Henry Purcell (1659–95). The anthem is a setting of a passage from the litany compiled by Thomas Cranmer, Archbishop of Canterbury, and later included in the Anglican Book of Common Prayer. It was composed circa 1679–82 at the beginning of Purcell's tenure as Organist and Master of the Choristers for Westminster Abbey.

== Composition ==
"Remember not, Lord, our offences" is an anthem for an a cappella choir consisting of five voice parts: two soprano parts, alto, tenor and bass (SSATB). Purcell originally composed the 44-measure work in the key of A minor. Some arrangements of the anthem include a continuo instrumental accompaniment. Musicologist and historian Franklin B. Zimmerman (born 1923) designated the anthem as "Z.50" in his catalogue of Purcell's works. The duration of performances and recordings of this work is approximately three minutes.

The lyrics of Purcell's anthem are drawn from a passage in the beginning of the Exhortation and Litany compiled in 1544 by Thomas Cranmer (1489–1556), the Archbishop of Canterbury. Cranmer established the liturgical structures for the Church of England after the Reformation and prepared the church's first official authorised vernacular service. He derived the text of the litany from two medieval Sarum rite litanies and a German litany by Martin Luther. Cranmer added the litany to the 1549 edition of the Book of Common Prayer and it has been included in subsequent editions. Purcell set an excerpt from the litany:

Remember not, Lord, our offences,
Nor th' offences of our forefathers;
Neither take thou vengeance of our sins,
But spare us, good Lord.
Spare thy people, whom thou hast redeem'd
With thy most precious blood,
And be not angry with us for ever.
Spare us, good Lord.

Choir of Westminster Abbey, as pictured in The Illustrated London News in 1848

Scholars date the composition of "Remember not, Lord, our offences" to the period generally between 1679 and 1682. (Note: Zimmermann dates the anthem c. 1680–82; Shay and Thompson assert a date of c. 1679–81.) Cummings states that Purcell included it in a collection of anthems compiled in 1683. During this time, Purcell had been appointed Organist and Master of the Choristers of Westminster Abbey in 1679 with the resignation of John Blow. He dedicated the next few years entirely to the composition of sacred music. In July 1682, following the death of Edward Lowe, Purcell was appointed organist of the Chapel Royal—an office which he held simultaneously with his position at Westminster Abbey. In his personal life, Purcell had married Frances Peters (or Pieters) who bore him a son that died shortly after birth.

During the 1680s and tenure at Westminster Abbey and the Chapel Royal, Purcell compiled earlier and contemporary sacred music (including several of his own compositions) into one collection for the use of the choirs of both churches. Two extant manuscripts compiled by Purcell are currently held in the collections of the University of Cambridge's Fitzwilliam Museum. Both manuscripts include "Remember not, Lord, our offences".

The choral anthems, including "Remember not, Lord, our offences", that Purcell composed after his appointment to Westminster and before his appointment at the Chapel Royal are described as his "last concentrated involvement with the verse anthem without strings." After 1681, Purcell began including string accompaniments to his choral anthems—a shift that musicologist Martin Adams attributes to having more resources available to him with his appointment to the Chapel Royal. Adams states that the anthems of this period included revisions of earlier works, including his well-known setting of the Anglican funeral sentences, and that these works are "distinguished by complex contrapuntal textures, a concentration on a limited quantity of motivic material, and the somber expression of penitential texts." Purcell's anthems reflect the influence of compositional techniques developed by earlier composers William Byrd and Orlando Gibbons. These anthems are closely related to those composed by Purcell's friend and teacher, John Blow, "with their basso seguente continuo and severe counterpoint, they are true stile antico."

== See also ==
- Anglican church music
- List of compositions by Henry Purcell
