= Queen's funeral =

Queen's funeral may refer to:

- Funeral Sentences and Music for the Funeral of Queen Mary, music by Henry Purcell, 1695
- Death and state funeral of Queen Victoria, 1901
- Death and funeral of Queen Elizabeth The Queen Mother, 2002
- Death and state funeral of Elizabeth II, 2022
