= Music for a While =

Song by Henry Purcell

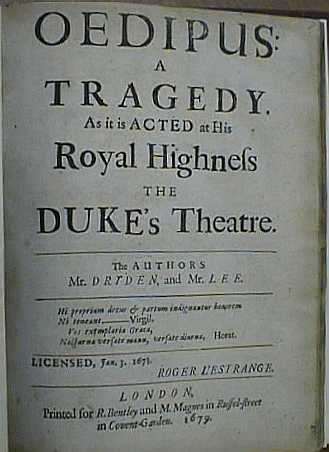
Oedipus, title page of the play.

"Music for a While" is a song for voice and continuo by the English Baroque composer Henry Purcell.

== Structure ==
Based on a repeating ground bass pattern, it is the second of four movements from his incidental music (Z 583) to Oedipus, a version of Sophocles' play by John Dryden and Nathaniel Lee, published in 1679. It was composed for a revival of the work in 1692. The song was published posthumously in Orpheus Britannicus, book 2, 1702.

It is sometimes described as a da capo aria, but this is incorrect, since Da Capo has two distinct and contrasting sections that can be marked as A and B, and, when put together, we call them ABA in form, accompanied by the words Da Capo written at the end of section B. Operatic Works written 20 or 30 years later than Purcell's era / time were then set into a fixed pattern of construction. The B section would be the composer's opportunity to write something perhaps very contrasting in nature from Section A. While Mr Purcell modulates away from the home key of C minor, it is not written as a Da Capo composition. This waits for a later date in the early 18th century to be used and standardised over and over again in a recognisable format. Structurally, it is an extension of the ground bass, which repeats the same structure throughout, but moves to related keys before returning to the original key. Nowhere is the phrase Da Capo employed by the composer.

== Music ==
The voice is accompanied by an instrumental part featuring a ground bass. Harmonies and suitable counterpoint would have been supplied by one or more musicians playing continuo on harpsichord or other keyboard instrument, or theorbo or bass viol.

Interestingly, the principal ground bass phrase, played before the entrance of the voice, is three bars long instead of the far more usual four.

== Text ==
Music for a while
Shall all your cares beguile.

Wond'ring how your pains were eas'd
And disdaining to be pleas'd
Till Alecto free the dead
From their eternal bands,
Till the snakes drop from her head,
And the whip from out her hands.

Music for a while
Shall all your cares beguile.

The text is part of a longer musical interlude in act 3, scene 1 of Oedipus.

== Recordings ==
The song is identified with Alfred Deller, the first modern countertenor. He seems to have first recorded it in the 1940s. It also appeared in an extended play compilation in the 1950s.

In 2020, during the coronavirus lockdown, The King's Singers invited Polish countertenor Jakub Józef Orliński to collaborate on a remote performance, which subsequently received over a million views on YouTube.

== See also ==
- Henry Purcell

== Bibliography ==
- Horton, Scott (8 March 2009). "Dryden/Purcell – 'Music for a While'". Harper's Magazine.
