= Alecto =

Fury (Erinys) in Greek mythology

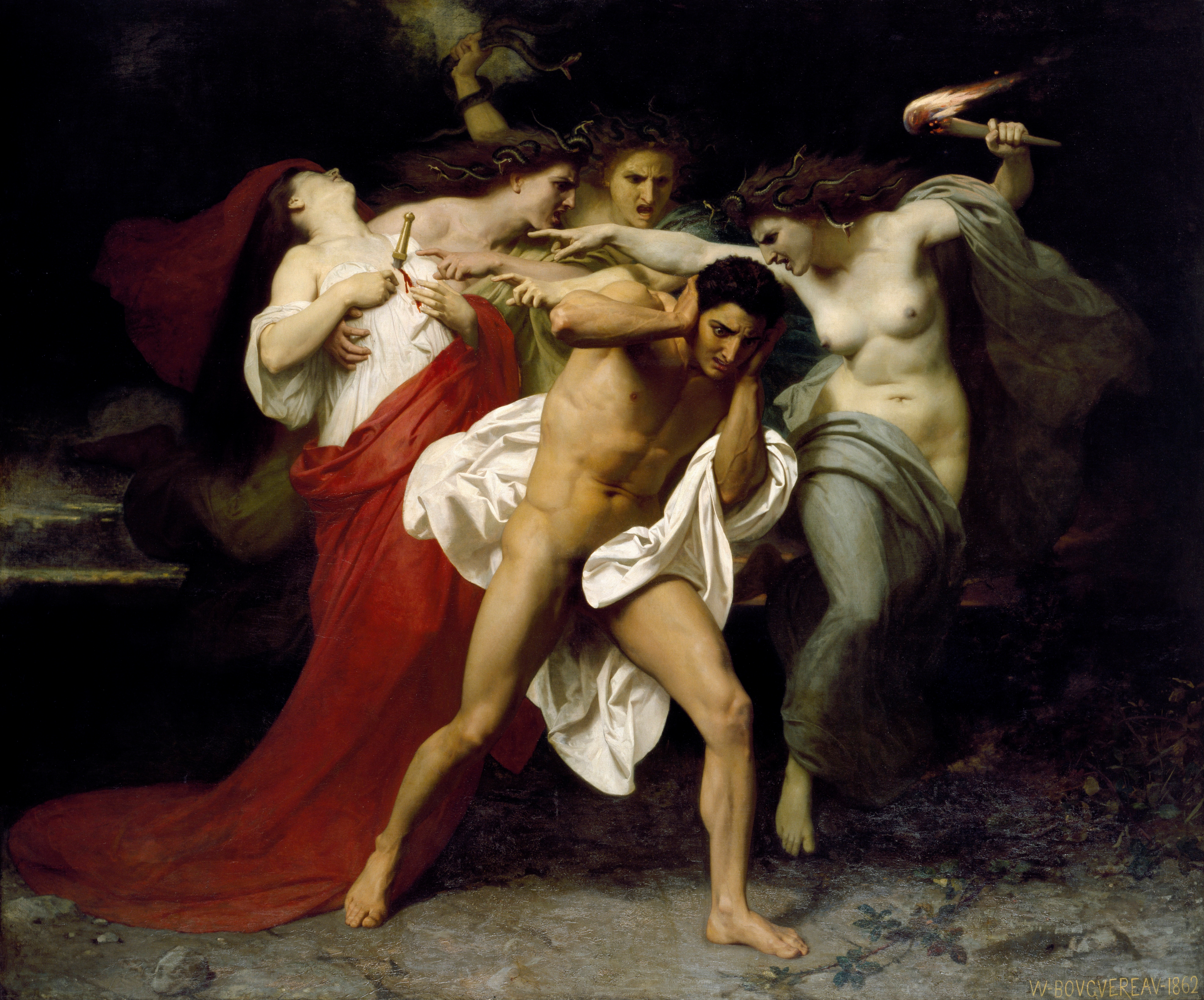
Orestes Pursued by the Furies by William-Adolphe Bouguereau

Alecto (Ancient Greek: Ἀληκτώ, romanized: Alēktṓ, lit. 'Unceasing anger') is one of the Erinyes or Furies in classical mythology, primarily in Roman mythology.

== Family and description ==
According to early Greek accounts, like that of Hesiod, the Erinyes were daughters of Gaea fertilized by the blood spilled from Uranus when Cronus castrated him. In later Roman accounts, like that of Virgil, they are depicted in individualized form as three sisters: Alecto, Tisiphone and Megaera. These three Furies had snakes for hair and blood dripped from their eyes; plus, they had wings. Alecto's job as a Fury is castigating the moral crimes (such as anger) of humans, especially if they are against others.

Alecto's function is similar to Nemesis, with the difference that Nemesis's function is to castigate crimes against the gods, not mortals. Her punishment for mortals was Madness.

== In mythology ==
In Virgil's Aeneid (Book VII), Juno commanded the Fury Allecto (spelled with two l's) to prevent the Trojans from having their way with King Latinus by marriage or besieging Italian borders. Allecto's mission is to wreak havoc on the Trojans and cause their downfall through war. To do this, Allecto takes over the body of Queen Amata, who clamors for all of the Latin mothers to riot against the Trojans. She disguises herself as Juno's priestess Calybe and appears to Turnus in a dream persuading him to begin the war against the Trojans. Met with a mocking response from Turnus, Allecto abandons persuasion and attacks Turnus with a torch, causing his blood to "boil with the passion for war". Unsatisfied with her work in igniting the war, Allecto asks Juno if she can provoke more strife by drawing in bordering towns. Juno replies that she will manage the rest of the war herself: "You're roving far too freely, high on the heavens' winds, and the Father, king of steep Olympus, won't allow it. You must give way. Whatever struggle is still to come, I'll manage it myself."

== In culture ==
=== Literature ===
- Alecto appears in Book VII of Virgil's Aeneid.
- Alecto appears in the medieval Irish epic Táin Bó Cúailnge where she is equated with the Mórrígan, the Irish mythological figure associated with battle and death.
- She briefly appears in Canto IX of Dante's Inferno with her sisters before the gates of Dis, threatening to unveil the Medusa.
- She appears in books VIII and IX of Torquato Tasso's Jerusalem Delivered, bringing false visions and discord to the Christian captains.
- Alecto is invoked in John Dryden's adaptation of Oedipus Rex.
- She is mentioned multiple times in Miklós Zrínyi's The Siege of Sziget.

=== Music ===
- Alecto is mentioned in the song by Henry Purcell Music for a While.

=== Astronomy ===
- Minor planet 465 Alekto is named in her honor.

== See also ==
- Family tree of the Greek gods
