= Fairest Isle =

17th century song by Henry Purcell

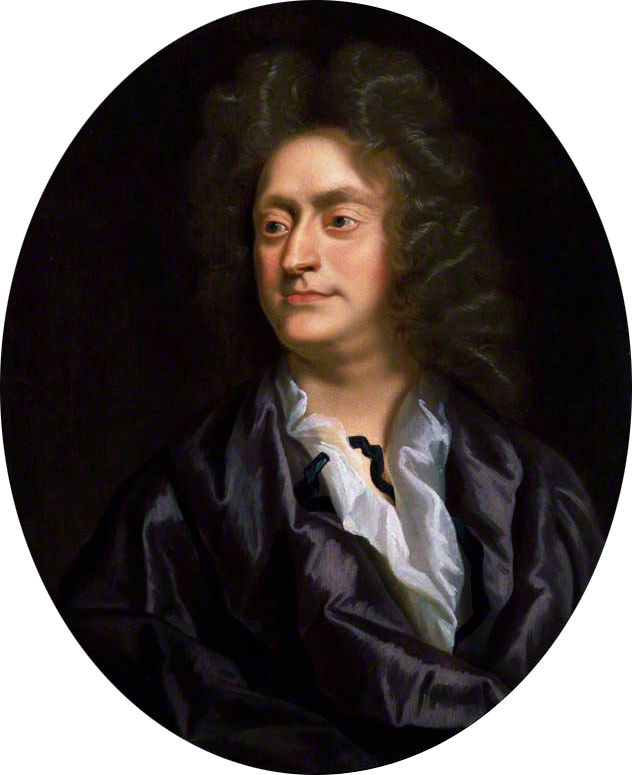
Portrait of Henry Purcell by John Closterman, c. 1695

"Fairest Isle" is one of the best-regarded songs by the 17th-century English composer Henry Purcell, a setting of words by John Dryden. It first appeared as a soprano solo in their semi-opera King Arthur (1691), where it is sung by the goddess Venus in praise of the island of Britain as the home of Love. It has since frequently been performed separately as a concert piece by both sopranos and countertenors.

== Text ==
Fairest Isle, all Isles Excelling, Seat of Pleasure and of Love;
Venus, here, will choose her Dwelling, and forsake her Cyprian grove.

Cupid from his Fav'rite Nation, Care and Envy will Remove;
Jealousie, that poysons Passion, and Despair that dies for Love.

Gentle Murmurs, sweet Complaining, Sighs that blow the Fire of Love;
Soft Repulses, kind Disdaining, shall be all the Pains you prove.

Every Swain shall pay his Duty, grateful every Nymph shall prove;
And as these Excel in Beauty, those shall be Renown’d for Love.

== Music and lyric ==
"Fairest Isle" forms part of a sequence of songs, dramatically somewhat unconnected, which form the masque in act 5 of King Arthur. It is sung by Venus, a soprano part, and takes the form of a minuet in which, according to Grove, the "noble melody is supported by richly dissonant harmony". Being in triple time it might have seemed ill-assorted with Dryden's lyrics, which are in duple metre, but for Purcell's art in reconciling the different metres. At the time this was a quite common practice for English composers, necessitated by the dominance of duple metre in 17th-century English poetry. An instrumental arrangement of "Fairest Isle" is preserved in Purcell's Ayres for the Theatre and presumably was intended to be played at some point in King Arthur, but precisely where is not known.

== Reception ==
In the general neglect which befell most of Purcell's secular music in the century after his death in 1695, "Fairest Isle" was one of a small number of patriotic songs by him – others include "Genius of England", "Britons, Strike Home!" and "Let the Soldiers Rejoice" – which maintained a regular presence on the stage and in the concert hall. Charles Wesley's hymn "Love Divine, All Loves Excelling" was first sung to Purcell's music for "Fairest Isle", and in places echoes its lyrics. In 1770, when David Garrick staged a version of King Arthur deprived of many of Purcell's songs, particularly those in the act 5 masques, "Fairest Isle" survived the cuts. Charles Burney, in the third volume of his General History of Music (1789), wrote that "This is one of the few airs that time has not the power to injure. It is of all ages and countries." Its popularity nevertheless waned from the mid-19th century until the early 20th. Among those who revived its reputation were Jack Westrup, who wrote of it as a "spacious tune" that expressed an unostentatious "patriotism of the spirit" rather than the patriotism of banners and bugles, and Robert T. White, who considered it one of the greatest songs in the whole of the old English repertoire. It is now considered by many to be Purcell's greatest song, and has been lauded as a "sublime soprano solo" of "the most tender poise and elegant gravity". Its lyric has been called one of the most famous in the English language. In 1995, the 300th anniversary of Purcell's death, the BBC launched a year-long festival of British music under the title "Fairest Isle". It was ushered in by a radio play, Steven Wyatt's Fairest Isle, a documentary drama about the writing and first production of King Arthur in which the eponymous song figured repeatedly. Singers who have recorded "Fairest Isle" include Nancy Argenta, Catherine Bott, James Bowman, April Cantelo, Alfred Deller, Paul Esswood, Heather Harper, Yvonne Kenny, Felicity Lott, Andreas Scholl, and Maggie Teyte.
