= Thou knowest, Lord, the secrets of our hearts (Purcell) =

Choral settings composed by Henry Purcell

- Anthem by Henry Purcell
- Catalogue: Z. 58 (58a, 58b, 58c) · 860
- Genre: Sacred choral music
- Text: Funeral sentence from the Book of Common Prayer
- Language: English
- Scoring: SATB choir, continuo

"Thou knowest, Lord, the secrets of our hearts", Z. 58, designates two choral settings composed by Henry Purcell. The text is one of the Anglican funeral sentences from the Book of Common Prayer. Early versions began possibly in 1672 and were revised twice before 1680. Purcell composed his last version, in a different style, for the 1695 Music for the Funeral of Queen Mary, Z. 860.

== History ==
Purcell set several funeral sentences from the Anglican Book of Common Prayer (BCP) for choir and continuo. Some of his autographs and manuscript copies are extant and permit conclusions about his artistic development. Of the eight funeral sentences in the BCP, Purcell set the four that are performed at the grave, but not the ones opening a burial service. He combined two of these four sentences into one movement:

Man that is born of a woman hath but a short time to live
In the midst of life we are in death
Thou knowest, Lord, the secrets of our hearts

Purcell may have first set "Thou knowest" in 1672, perhaps to complete sentences by Henry Cooke for Cooke's funeral. It is a polyphonic setting. Purcell's autograph is extant and kept at the British Library. It is among the earliest manuscripts in his hand, showing some features of youthful writing. Purcell revised the setting up to around 1680, represented in a copied scorebook at Oxford's Christ Church, which was begun by Edward Lowe and continued by Richard Goodson. Other copies of the same version are also difficult to date. In 1681 at the latest, Purcell copied revised versions of other funeral sentences in a book of his collected works, leaving room for "Thou knowest" but not including it. Around the same time, he also copied works by earlier composers such as Thomas Tallis, William Byrd, and Christopher Gibbons, possibly to study their polyphony.

Purcell composed his last setting of the same sentence for the Music for the Funeral of Queen Mary in 1695, Z. 58C. Here, the words are set mostly in homophony, possibly to complete sentences by Thomas Morley, whose setting of this particular sentence was rediscovered only later. Purcell used an older style to match Morley's music.

The setting of the sentence in the funeral music for Queen Mary was published by E. C. Schirmer in 1925 and reprinted in the first "Concord Series" collection of forty anthems for use in the Protestant churches, edited by Archibald T. Davison and Henry Wilder Foote. A subsequent edition, published by Carus in 1978, is available online. The revised 1988 edition of Purcell's work included two revisions of the early version. Of two new 1995 editions, one by Christopher Hogwood contained three revisions.

== Text ==
The text is one of the Anglican sentences from the burial service in the Book of Common Prayer:

Thou knowest, Lord, the secrets of our hearts;
Shut not thy merciful ears unto our pray'rs;
But spare us, Lord most holy, O God most mighty.
O holy and most merciful Saviour,
Thou most worthy Judge eternal,
Suffer us not at our last hour,
For any pains of death to fall away from Thee.

== Recordings ==
In the collection Henry Purcell (1659–1695) / Complete Sacred Music – Anthems, Services and Devotional Songs, several versions of the sentences are recorded. The Sixteen offer the most accurate historic rendition by performing the early setting of funeral sentences first, and then the Music for the Funeral of Queen Mary, with instrumental music and the final setting of "Thou knowest" by Purcell and the other sentences by Morley.
