= 465 Alekto =

Main-belt asteroid

Discovery
- Discovered by: Max Wolf
- Discovery site: Heidelberg Observatory
- Discovery date: 13 January 1901

Designations
- Pronunciation: /əˈlɛktoʊ/
- Named after: Ἀληκτώ Ālēktō
- Alternative designations: 1901 FW, 1949 YE1, 1949 YU, 1968 PB, A907 EF, A916 YC
- Minor planet category: Main-belt asteroid
- Adjectives: Alektoian /ælɪkˈtoʊ.iən/

Orbital characteristics
- Epoch 31 July 2016 (JD 2457600.5)
- Uncertainty parameter 0
- Observation arc: 115.24 yr (42091 d)
- Aphelion: 3.7315 AU (558.22 Gm)
- Perihelion: 2.4538 AU (367.08 Gm)
- Semi-major axis: 3.0927 AU (462.66 Gm)
- Eccentricity: 0.20657
- Orbital period (sidereal): 5.44 yr (1986.5 d)
- Mean anomaly: 8.223375°
- Mean motion: 0° 10^{m} 52.396^{s} / day
- Inclination: 4.6493°
- Longitude of ascending node: 300.6133°
- Argument of perihelion: 283.7859°

Physical characteristics
- Dimensions: 73.34±2.8 km
- Synodic rotation period: 10.938 h (0.4558 d)
- Sidereal rotation period: 10.938 hours
- Geometric albedo: 0.0433±0.004
| Surface temp. | min | mean | max |
|---|---|---|---|
| Kelvin |
- Absolute magnitude (H): 9.7

465 Alekto is a main-belt asteroid. It was discovered by Max Wolf on January 13, 1901. Its provisional name was 1901 FW. It is named for Alecto from Greek Mythology.
