= Hear my prayer, O Lord (Purcell) =

Choral anthem by Henry Purcell

- Anthem by Henry Purcell
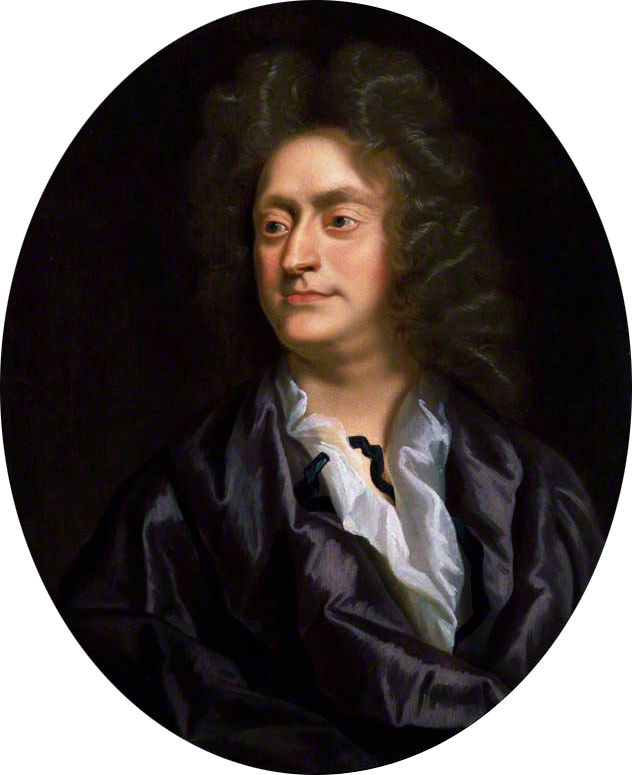
- Portrait of the composer by John Closterman, 1695
- Key: C minor
- Catalogue: Z. 15
- Genre: Sacred choral music
- Text: Excerpt from the Litany from Book of Common Prayer
- Language: English
- Composed: c. 1682
- Scoring: SSAATTBB choir, optional continuo

"Hear my prayer, O Lord", Z. 15, is an eight-part choral anthem by the English composer Henry Purcell (1659–1695). The anthem is a setting of the first verse of Psalm 102 in the version of the Book of Common Prayer. Purcell composed it c. 1682, at the beginning of his tenure as Organist and Master of the Choristers for Westminster Abbey.

== History and music ==
The composition is thought to have been intended to be part of a longer work, indicated by several blank pages following it in the autograph, which is held by the Fitzwilliam Museum in Cambridge. The text of the extant music are the first verse of Psalm 102: "Hear my prayer, O Lord, and let my crying come unto thee." (Psalms 102:1). Purcell set it for an a cappella choir consisting of eight voice parts: two soprano parts, two altos, two tenors and two basses (SSAATTBB). The anthem is 34 measures long, and is written in the key of C minor. Some arrangements include a continuo instrumental accompaniment. Musicologist and historian Franklin B. Zimmerman designated the anthem as "Z. 15" in his catalogue of Purcell's works. The duration of performances and recordings of this work varies considerably, from about two minutes to over three minutes in length.

Purcell begins the composition with a simple setting of the first line on one tone, with only one exception, a minor third up on the word "O". After the first phrases, Purcell employs six to eight parts, in complex "pungent" harmonies which build to what the conductor Robert King calls "an inexorable vocal crescendo lasting over three minutes, culminating on a monumental discord on the last repetition of 'come'". Musicologist Timothy Dickey notes that Purcell "gradually amplified the vocal texture, and intensifies the harmonic complexity, until all eight voices combine in a towering dissonant tone cluster which desperately demands the final cadential resolution."

The anthem has been recorded many times, including a 1995 release by the Collegium Vocale Gent, conducted by Philippe Herreweghe, and one from 2006 by the Choir of Clare College Cambridge, conducted by Timothy Brown.

== Legacy ==
The Swedish composer Sven-David Sandström used this piece for a composition of the same name, wherein, just shortly before the final cadence, the pieces collapses and builds up again from small bits of melody from the original.
