= Funeral Sentences and Music for the Funeral of Queen Mary =

Musical composition by Henry Purcell

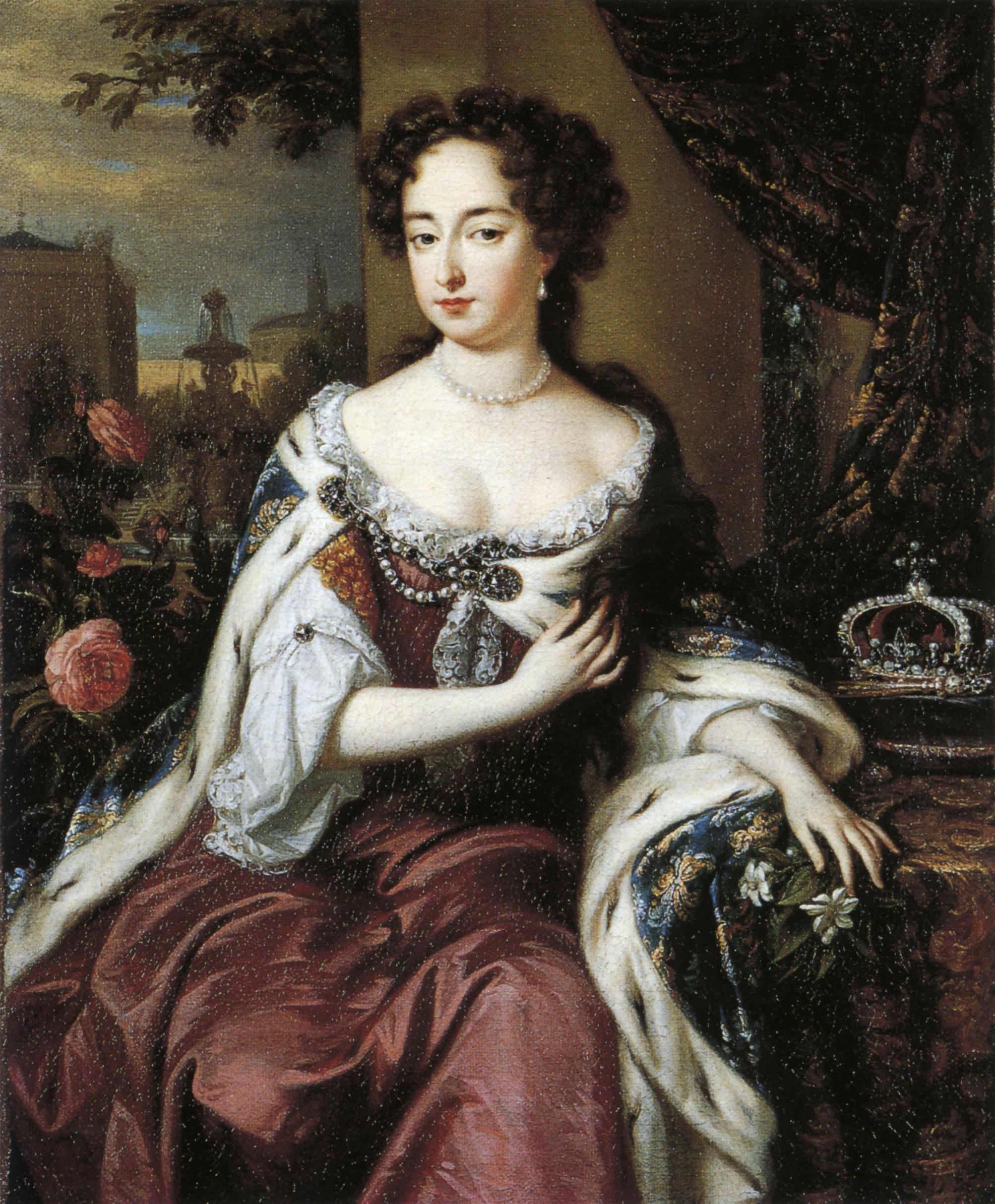
Queen Mary II in 1685, by Jan Verkolje. National Portrait Gallery, London

The English composer Henry Purcell wrote funeral music that includes his Funeral Sentences and the later Music for the Funeral of Queen Mary, Z. 860. Two of the funeral sentences, "Man that is born of a woman" Z. 27 and "In the midst of life we are in death" Z. 17, survive in autograph score. The Music for the Funeral of Queen Mary comprises the March and Canzona Z. 780 and the funeral sentence "Thou knowest, Lord, the secrets of our hearts" Z. 58C. It was first performed at the funeral of Queen Mary II of England in Westminster Abbey on 5 March 1695. Purcell's setting of "Thou knowest, Lord" was performed at his own funeral in November of the same year. In modern performances the March, Canzona and three funeral sentences are often combined as Purcell's Funeral Sentences, Z. 860.

== History ==
Purcell composed a setting of the sixth of the seven sentences of the Anglican Burial Service ("Thou Knowest Lord", Z. 58C) for the occasion, together with the March and Canzona, Z. 780. It is believed these were performed with settings of the other six sentences by the Elizabethan composer Thomas Morley. Purcell had much earlier composed settings of three of the Burial Service sentences, including two different ones of "Thou Knowest Lord". The earlier settings are contained in autograph score, but there is no autograph of the 1695 music. Later in 1695 Purcell reused the March and Canzona as part of the incidental music for Thomas Shadwell's play The Libertine.

When William Croft was commissioned to write another setting for the burial service, he freely admitted that he had imitated Purcell's style "as near as I could". Croft preserved the whole of Purcell's "Thou knowest, Lord" within his new work, stating that "The reason why I did not compose that verse anew (so as to render the whole service entirely of my own composition) is obvious to every Artist". Croft's funeral sentences, and therefore Purcell's along with it, have been sung at nearly every royal and state funeral in England over the last three centuries.

== Text and instrumentation ==
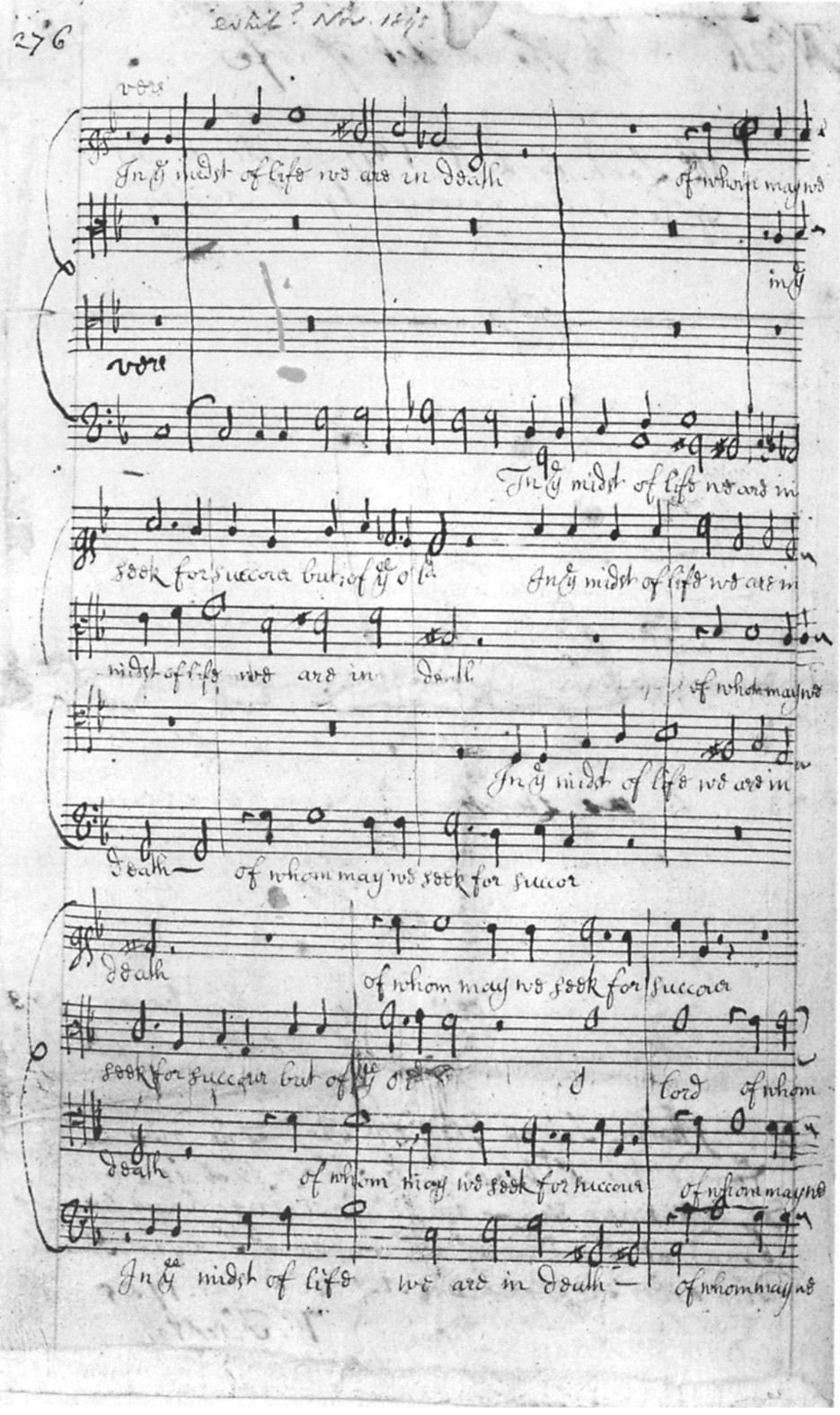
Autograph manuscript of the second Funeral Sentence, British Library

The work is scored for soprano, alto, tenor, and bass, four trumpets, and basso continuo. The text is from the Book of Common Prayer (1662):

1. Man that is born of a woman
hath but a short time to live,
and is full of misery.
He cometh up, and is cut down like a flower;
he fleeth as it were a shadow,
and ne'er continueth in one stay.

2. In the midst of life we are in death:
of whom may we seek for succour,
but of thee, O Lord,
who for our sins art justly displeased?

Yet, O Lord, O Lord most mighty,
O holy and most merciful Saviour,
deliver us not into the bitter pains
of eternal death.

3. Thou knowest, Lord, the secrets of our hearts;
shut not thy merciful ears unto our pray'rs;
but spare us, Lord most holy, O God most mighty.

O holy and most merciful Saviour,
thou most worthy Judge eternal,
suffer us not, at our last hour,
for any pains of death, to fall from thee. Amen.

== Music ==
March of the Funeral March for Queen Mary
A version of The March; adapted for trumpet and trombone, and later euphonium and tuba, accompanied by tupan

The March, in C minor, was written for a quartet of flatt trumpets, which, as slide trumpets, could play notes outside of the harmonic series and thus in a minor key. Following the March is the Canzona, also in C minor. "Thou Knowest Lord" is in E♭ major and is a stirring hymn-like setting with all the voice parts moving in the same rhythm.

Purcell's earlier setting of the fourth sentence of the Burial Service, "Man that is born of a woman", introduces a melancholy theme. Purcell brings tension to the phrase with "hath but a short time to live", and the melody rises and falls with the words "he cometh up and is cut down like a flower". With "In the midst of life we are in death", an earlier setting of the fifth sentence, Purcell begins with a soprano part that is passed on to the choir. The music portrays with chromaticism an air of anguish. There are two earlier versions of "Thou Knowest Lord".

== In popular culture ==
Music from the March was adapted by Wendy Carlos for the soundtrack of Stanley Kubrick's 1971 film, A Clockwork Orange. Robin Beanland would later adapt the music for the opening cut-scene of Rare Ltd.'s 2001 videogame, Conker's Bad Fur Day, as the scene homages Kubrick's film.
