= Britons, Strike Home! =

17th century British song

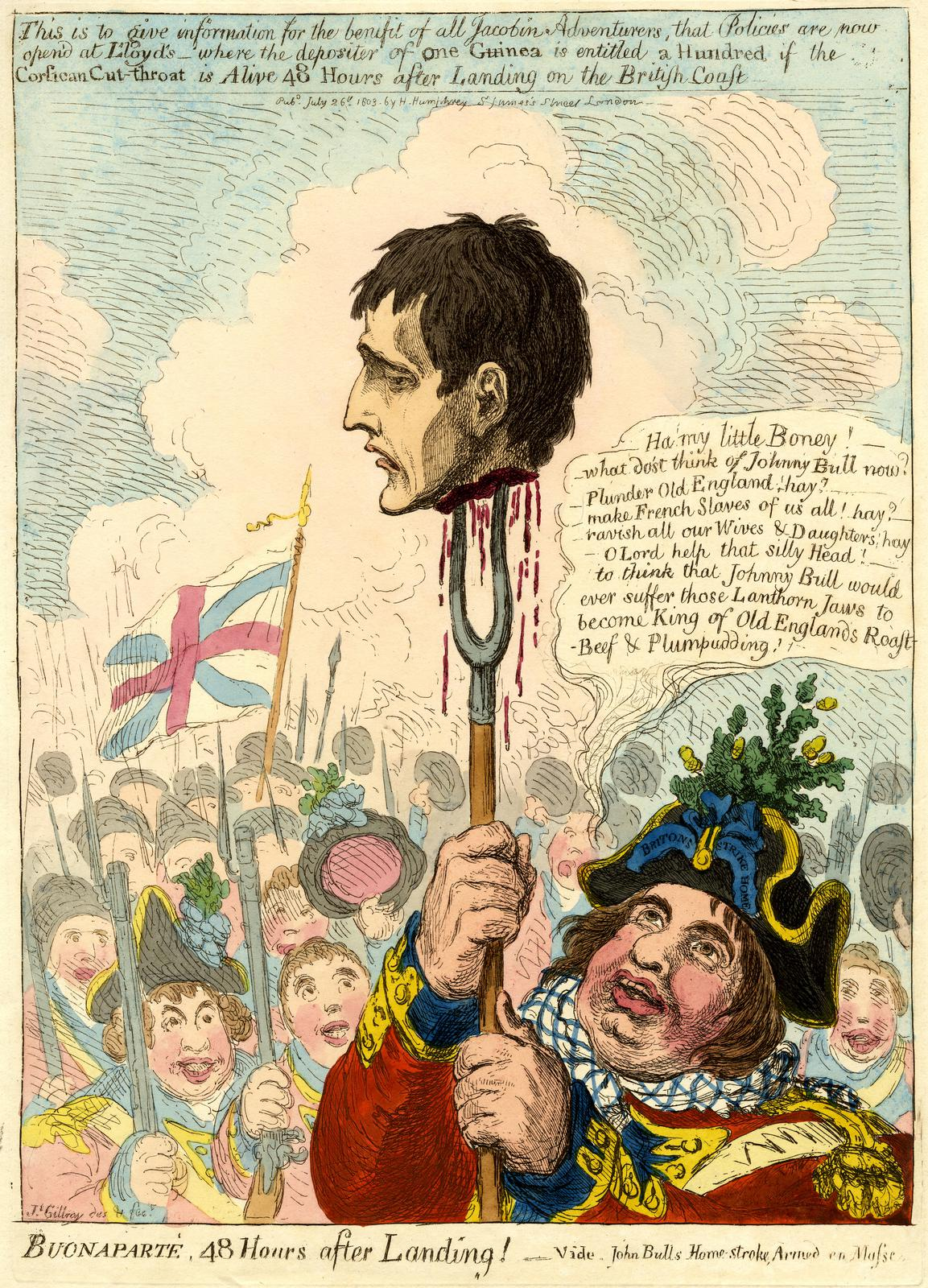
An unusually vicious caricature print by James Gillray dated 1803 and entitled "BUONAPARTE, 48 Hours after Landing!". Napoleon's severed head is held aloft on a pitchfork by John Bull whose hat bears the legend "BRITONS STRIKE HOME", which was a popular slogan during the Napoleonic Wars.

Britons, Strike Home! is a British patriotic song, originally an air written for a theatrical production by Henry Purcell in 1695. It was popular during the various wars of the 18th and early 19th centuries.

== Origin ==
In the last year of Purcell's life, he wrote the music for an October 1695 adaptation of John Fletcher's tragedy, Bonduca, called Bonduca, or the British Heroine. Purcell's score has the "Z number" Z 574 and ranks amongst his finest music for the theatre, In the play, the Ancient British general, Charatach is trying to rouse the army of Queen Bonduca against the Romans. He appeals to their god Divine Andate and finally commands, Now Sing, ye Druids. The Druids take up the theme with a duet, To Arms, To Arms! followed by a solo and Druid chorus, Britons, Strike Home! In 1728, the tune was used as Air LIX in The Beggar's Opera by John Gay.

== Lyrics ==
=== Purcell's original lyrics ===
(Solo by the Chief Druid, repeated by the chorus of Druids)

Britons, strike home!
Revenge, revenge your Country's wrong.
Fight! Fight and record. Fight!
Fight and record yourselves in Druid's Song.
Fight! Fight and record. Fight!
Fight and record yourselves in Druid's Song.

=== Lyrics composed during the Invasion Scare of 1803–1805 ===
Should Frenchmen e'er pollute Britannia's strand,
Or press with hostile hoof this sacred strand;
The daring deed should every Briton arm
To save his native land from dire alarm;
Her freeborn sons should instant take the field,
The Altar and the Throne to shield.
Chorus
Britons, strike home! avenge your country's cause,
Protect your King, your Liberties, and Laws!

There are a further five verses.

== Notable uses ==
- At the Battle of Dettingen on 16 June 1743, a trumpeter in the Earl of Crawford's Troop of Horse Guards stood up in his stirrups and played Britons, Strike Home! just before they made a charge.
- During the American War of Independence, the noted Loyalist, Rebecca Franks, attended a society ball in New York, given by the British commander, Sir Henry Clinton. Her support for the British cause did not protect the general from her barbed wit; when he called out for the orchestra to play Britons, Strike Home!, she riposted; "The Commander-in-Chief has made a mistake, he meant to say 'Britons – go home!'".
- At the Siege of Savendroog (Suvarnadurg) in December 1791, during the Third Anglo-Mysore War, the band of the 52nd Regiment of Foot played the tune as a party of specially selected troops climbed a rocky outcrop to capture the eastern citadel.
- Following the collapse of the First Coalition, on 10 November 1797, the British Prime Minister, William Pitt the Younger, announced to the House of Commons that his efforts to make peace with Revolutionary France had failed and that he was now determined to fight the war to its conclusion. In response, the whole House rose to its feet and sang Britons, Strike Home!. The result was the War of the Second Coalition.
- Before the Battle of the Gut of Gibraltar on 12 July 1801, the garrison band of Gibraltar played the tune while Rear-Admiral Sir James Saumarez's squadron sailed out of the harbour to meet the Franco-Spanish fleet.
- At the Battle of Trafalgar on 21 October 1805, the band aboard HMS Tonnant played Britons, Strike Home! as she sailed into action, only ceasing to play when a round shot killed two bandsmen.
- The caricaturist George Cruikshank made a satirical print of the Peterloo Massacre of 1819, lampooning the Yeomanry cavalry for charging into a crowd of unarmed demonstrators, and entitled; The Massacre of Peterloo or "Britons strike home"!!!.
- It was used to signal an uprising against Nazi occupiers in the last episode of the 1978 BBC alternate history miniseries, An Englishman's Castle, based on a play by Philip Mackie.
