= Bonduca =

Play written by John Fletcher

Bonduca is a Jacobean tragi-comedy in the Beaumont and Fletcher canon, generally judged by scholars to be the work of John Fletcher alone. It was acted by the King's Men c. 1613, and published in 1647 in the first Beaumont and Fletcher folio.

The play is a dramatisation of the story of Boudica, the British Celtic queen who led a revolt against the Romans in 60–61 AD. Critics, however, have classified Bonduca as a "historical romance," rather than a history play comparable to those written by Shakespeare; historical accuracy was not Fletcher's primary concern. The play constantly shifts between comedy and tragedy.

The principal hero is not Bonduca herself, but rather Caratach (Caratacus), who is anachronistically depicted as her general, despite having been exiled from Britain almost a decade prior. Nennius, the legendary British opponent of Julius Caesar, is also included. However, most of the action takes place from the Roman point of view, centring on the Roman officers Junius and Petillius, who fall in love with Bonduca's two daughters. Petillius is a fictionalised version of Quintus Petillius Cerialis.

== Characters ==
- Caratach, General of the Britons, brother-in-law to Bonduca.
- Nennius, a British Commander.
- Hengo, Nephew to Caratach and Bonduca.
- Suetonius, General of the Roman Army in Britain.
- Poenius, a Roman commander
- Junius, a Roman commander
- Demetrius, a Roman commander
- Decius, a Roman commander
- Petillius, a Roman commander
- Curious, a Roman commander
- Regulus, an officer under Poenius
- Drusus, an officer under Poenius
- Bonduca, Queen of the Iceni.
- Bonduca's first daughter.
- Bonduca's second daughter.
- Macer, a Roman Lieutenant.
- Judas, a Roman Corporal.
- Herald.
- Druids.
- Soldiers.
- Guides, Servants.

== Plot ==
Bonduca, the queen of the Iceni, gloats over the defeats suffered by the Romans at the hands of her forces. She predicts that the Romans will soon be crushed. Bonduca's confidence is challenged by her general Caratach, who tells her that the Romans are not easily crushed and that the war will be very different from the tribal conflicts they are familiar with. It will be either total victory or utter defeat. Bonduca accepts Caratach's words of caution.

In the Roman camp, one of the officers, Junius, is depressed because he is in love. His friend Petillius tries to cheer him up, but to no avail. Junius reveals that his beloved is Bonduca's younger daughter. Soldiers led by corporal Judas enter, complaining that they are starving. Petillius and Junius tell them to remember their duties. The commander Suetonius is informed of the restive state of the troops. He tells his officers that he intends to provoke a decisive battle. An officer is sent to contact Poenius Postumus, another Roman commander, to join his army with Suetonius' force.

In Poenius's camp the troops are keen to join their comrades, but the haughty Poenius refuses to accept orders from Suetonius, considering battle against the much larger Briton force to be suicidal. He refuses to send the troops. Back in Suetonius' camp Petillius and fellow officers make fun of the love-stuck Junius. Petillius bets another officer, Demetrius, that Poenius will refuse to join them.

In Bonduca's camp Judas and some Roman soldiers have been captured while foraging for food. The Britons ridicule the half-starved Romans. Bonduca's vengeful daughters are keen to hang the captured men, but Caratach intervenes and orders them to be well fed and sent back to the Roman camp. While plying them with food and drink he extracts information from them. Judas reveals Junius' love for Bonduca's younger daughter. She decides she will write a fake love letter to him to capture him. She gives it to Judas, who returns with the others to the Roman camp, drunk.

In the British camp Bonduca makes an impassioned appeal to the thunder god Taranis, while the Druids make sacrifices and read omens. The daughters also pray for victory. Caratach gives a rousing speech to the troops. In the Roman camp Junius reads the fake love-letter, in which Bonduca's daughter tells him that he has won her love. If he meets her, she will allow herself and her family to be captured, as long as they will be well treated. Junius and his friends decide to trust the daughter's plans. Meanwhile, Suetonius gives his own speech to his troops.

Caratach watches the movements of the armies. Poenius also observes from a distance. Junius and the others are brought to Bonduca's daughters in captivity, having been lured into the trap. Junius is taunted by the younger daughter. Her viciousness cures him of any feelings for her. The daughters intend to kill the Romans, but again Caratach intervenes and insists that honourable adversaries should not resort to such tricks. He frees them.

Poenius watches as the small Roman army is apparently overwhelmed by the British forces, but the fog of the battle conceals things. In the midst of the struggle Suetonius and Petillius keep the Romans together. Junius and the others arrive back just as the battle is turning in favour of the Romans. Watching from the hill Caratach berates Bonduca for launching a mass-attack, as the British superiority in numbers is turned against them, creating a crush between the Romans and the baggage train. Victorious, Suetonius pursues the retreating Britons. Caratach and his young nephew Hengo escape after a fight with Junius.

After the battle Petillius continues to ridicule Junius for his former love-sickness. Suetonius tells Petillius to contact Poenius, who he intends to forgive for failing to join the battle. Caratach and Hengo encounter Judas and other soldiers. In the fight Judas is humiliated by the brave boy, while the other soldiers flee from Caratach. Petillius goes to meet Poenius, who is depressed. He tells him of Suetonius' forgiveness, but also gives away his own view that Poenius' honour is irretrievable. Poenius says he will kill himself. Petillius agrees. Poenius stabs himself. His friends blame Petillius for his death.

Bonduca and her daughters are surrounded in a fortress. Suetonius asks them to surrender, but Bonduca refuses. The Romans attempt to breach the defences. The younger daughter now pleads with her mother to surrender, but her mother and her sister scorn her. When the wall is breached, Bonduca forces her younger daughter to kill herself. The older daughter gives a grand speech of self-sacrifice, leading Petillius to fall in love with her. She and Bonduca kill themselves.

Caratach and Hengo watch the funeral of Poenius. Meanwhile, Petillius can't stop thinking about Bonduca's older daughter, and Junius takes the opportunity to play tricks on him in revenge for the ridicule he had received. The Romans make the capture of Caratach a priority. Junius is promoted, but Petillius is not because of his role in Poenius' suicide. Depressed Petillius asks Junius to kill him, but Junius tells him that Suetonius has only put off the promotion to placate Poenius' friends. In fact he has put Petillius in charge of capturing Caratach. Judas plans to trick Caratach by leaving food and drink for him. Caratach and Hengo find the provisions, but when Hengo comes out into the open Judas shoots him. He dies in Caratach's arms. With a single stone-throw, Caratach kills Judas. Petillius and Junius arrive and fight Caratach but he surrenders only when Suetonius appears. Caratach is sent to Rome and Petillius is promoted.

== Text ==
Bonduca has a two-way relationship of influence or borrowing with other plays before and after it. Arthur Sherbo discovered a range of parallels and commonalities between the play and Christopher Marlowe's Tamburlaine, Part I (c. 1587). In the opposite chronological direction, S. W. Brossman identified borrowings from Bonduca in John Dryden's Cleomenes (1692).

A list of the cast members survives from the original production of Bonduca by the King's Men. The list includes: Richard Burbage, Henry Condell, John Lowin, William Ostler, John Underwood, Nicholas Tooley, William Ecclestone, and Richard Robinson.

In addition to the 1647 printed text, the play exists in manuscript form. The manuscript was written by Edward Knight, the "book-keeper" or prompter of the King's Men, probably c. 1630. In a note appended to his transcript, Knight explains that the original prompt-book that supported the stage performances had been lost, and that he had re-copied the author's "foul papers" into the existing manuscript. Knight, however, was unable to transcribe the entire play (he had to summarise the first two and a half scenes in Act V), because the set of foul papers from which he worked was itself incomplete – a useful demonstration of the difficulties in textual transmission that plagued English Renaissance theatre. (The missing scenes are present in the 1647 printed text, though their order, as Knight describes it, is reversed: his V,i comes second and his V,ii comes first.)

== Adaptations ==
Henry Purcell's last major work, composed in 1695, was music for an adaptation entitled Bonduca, or the British Heroine (Z. 574). Selections include "To Arms", "Britons, Strike Home!" and "O lead me to some peaceful gloom". An adaptation of the play was made by George Colman the Elder in the 18th century.

In the alternate history novel Ruled Britannia by Harry Turtledove, William Shakespeare writes a play entitled Boudicca to incite the people of Britain to revolt against Spanish conquerors. The speeches supposedly written by Shakespeare are taken from Bonduca.

== Critical views ==
Many scholars have argued that Fletcher's sympathies seem to lie more with the Romans than the Britons, though it has also been argued that the play constantly parallels the two sides.

Claire Jowitt in her article Colonialism, Politics, and Romanization in John Fletcher's "Bonduca" explores the ways in which the play engages with Britain's early-seventeenth-century colonial ambitions – in particular the Virginia colony. She also highlights the topical political allegories in the play. Jowitt argues that the play's sympathies are ambiguous. The Britons in part stand for the Native Americans of the Virginia colony, and are depicted as savage pagans. Nevertheless, the play invites the reader to patriotically identify with their resistance to Rome.

Ronald J. Boling and Julie Crawford argue that the nominal hero Caratach is portrayed in a satirical fashion, and that this probably represents contemporary ambivalence about the court of King James I.
