= Welcome to All the Pleasures =

Composition by Henry Purcell

- Sacred choral composition by Henry Purcell
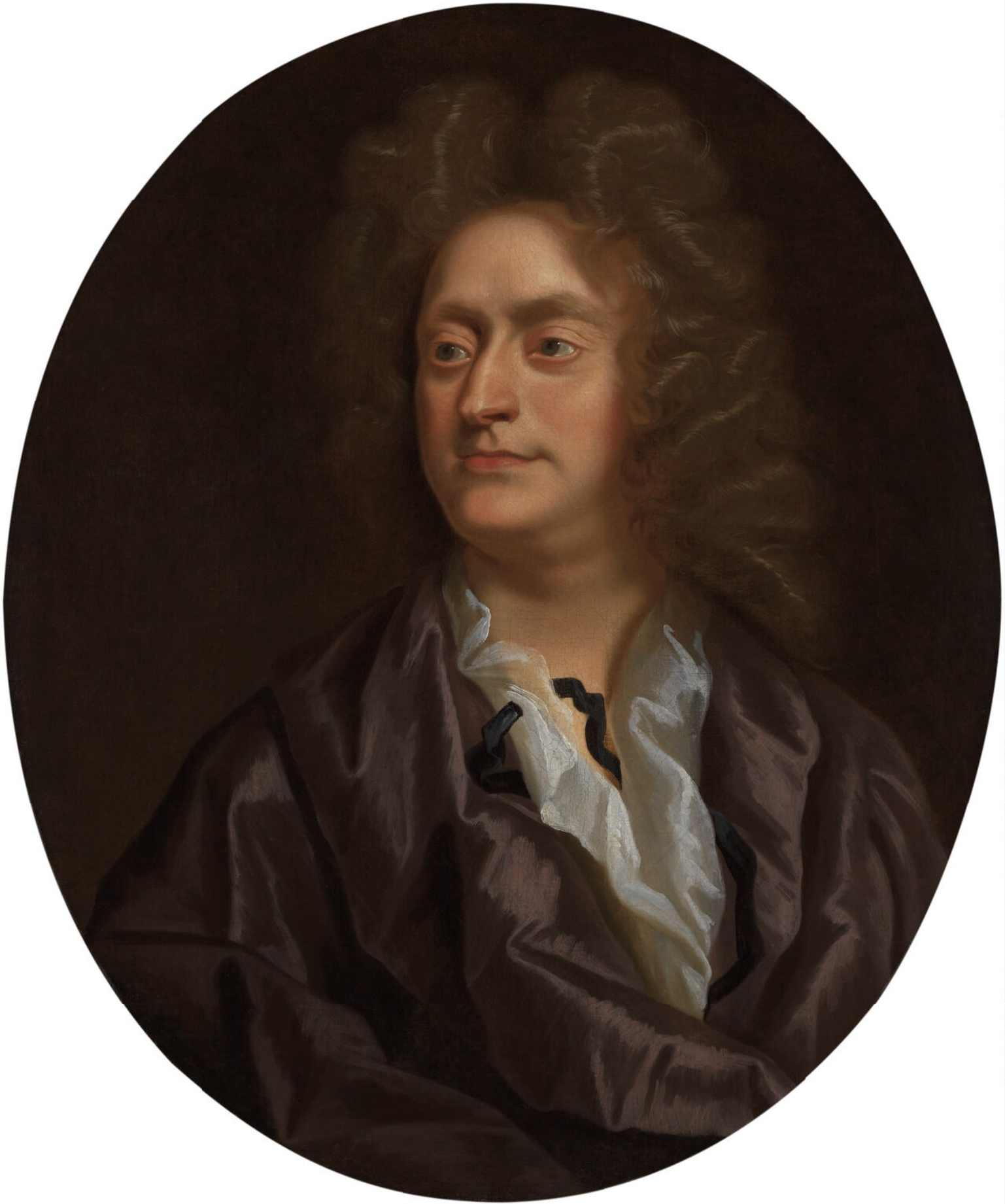
- c. 1695 portrait of Purcell
- Catalogue: Z. 339
- Text: by Christopher Fishburn
- Composed: 1683
- Scoring: Choir; orchestra

Premiere
- Date: 22 November 1683
- Location: London

Welcome to All the Pleasures, Z. 339, (Note: "Z" is Franklin B. Zimmerman's catalogue of Purcell's works.) is a 1683 composition by Henry Purcell, the first of a series he wrote in honour of the patron saint of music, Saint Cecilia. It was commissioned by an organisation called "The Musical Society" for performance in London on 22 November (the saint´s feast day).

== Words ==
Purcell set a text by Christopher Fishburn, a relatively obscure figure who was related to Sir Christopher Wren. It begins

Welcome to all the pleasures that delight
Of ev'ry sense the grateful appetite.
Hail, great assembly of Apollo's race.
Hail to this happy place, this musical assembly
That seems to be the arc of universal harmony.

== Music ==
The music is for vocal soloists, chorus and an ensemble of baroque instruments consisting of four-part strings (1st and 2nd violin, viola, cello) and basso continuo. As well as accompanying the singers, the instruments feature in an overture (called "symphony") and ritornelli. The piece takes about 18 minutes to perform.

=== Movements ===
Here the deities approve. This music is often sung by a countertenor, but here is sung by a female singer.

1. Symphony
2. Verse, chorus & ritornello: "Welcome to all the pleasures"
3. Song & ritornello: "Here the deities approve" (one of the best-known numbers)
4. Verse & ritornello: "While joys celestial their bright souls invade"
5. Song & chorus: "Then lift up your voices"
6. Verse & chorus: "Then lift up your voices"
7. Instrumental interlude
8. Song & ritornello: "Beauty, thou scene of love"
9. Song & chorus: "In a consort of voices while instruments play"

== Notable performances ==
The venue of the first performance in 1683 was York Buildings which is regarded as London's first regular concert hall. It was built on land previously occupied by York House.

The piece received its Proms premiere in 1963 when it was conducted by George Malcolm. The soloists were Alfred Deller (countertenor), Wilfred Brown (tenor) and John Shirley-Quirk (baritone).

== Publication ==
The work appeared in print in 1684, the year after its first performance. The publisher was John Playford and the work was printed by his nephew John Playford the Younger. John Playford the Elder was at the end of his career and by this stage had handed most of the running of his business near London's Temple Church to his son Henry.

Eulenberg brought out a miniature score in 1964. It was edited by Walter Bergmann, who was also active as a performer of baroque music: he had played harpsichord on the 1959 recording of the work.

=== Keyboard arrangement ===
After his father's death, Henry Playford went on to publish a keyboard arrangement of one of the numbers from the work, "Here the deities approve", under the title "A new ground" (a ground bass forms the basis of the piece). It appeared in the compilation "The second part of Musick's handmaid" (1689), and is now catalogued as ZT 682.

== Selected discography ==
Commercial recordings are mainly by British conductors, a notable exception is the Belgian Philippe Herreweghe who conducts the Collegium Vocale Gent in a 2007 version.

Versions include:

- Alfred Deller and the Deller Consort on Vanguard (recorded 1959).
- Robert King in his complete series of the Purcell odes on Hyperion (recorded 1988).
- Andrew Parrott on Erato (recorded 1988)

== See also ==
- Hail! Bright Cecilia
