= Hail! Bright Cecilia =

Festival ode by Pucell

- Sacred choral composition by Henry Purcell
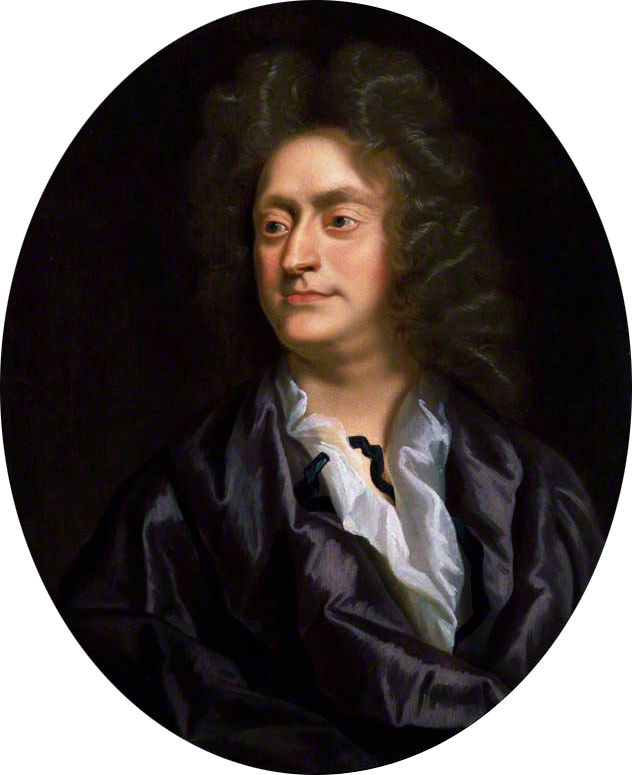
- Portrait of Purcell by John Closterman, 1695
- Catalogue: Z. 328
- Text: by Nicholas Brady
- Composed: 1692
- Scoring: SSATB choir, orchestra

Premiere
- Date: 22 September 1692
- Location: Stationers' Hall, London

Hail! Bright Cecilia (Z. 328), also known as Ode to St. Cecilia, was composed by Henry Purcell to a text by the Irishman Nicholas Brady in 1692 in honour of the feast day of Saint Cecilia, patron saint of musicians.

Annual celebrations of this saint's feast day (22 November) began in 1683, organised by the Musical Society of London, a group of musicians and music lovers. Welcome to all the pleasures (Z. 339) was written by Purcell in 1683 and he went on to write other Cecilian pieces of which Hail! Bright Cecilia remains the best known. The first performance on 22 September 1692 at Stationers' Hall was a great success, and received an encore.

== Text ==
Brady's poem was derived from John Dryden's "A Song for St Cecilia's Day" of 1687. Following Dryden, Brady extols the birth and personality of musical instruments, including the idea that Cecilia invented the organ (see note ^{1}). Purcell responds to the text by giving emphasis to the colours and dramatic possibilities of the baroque orchestra. The reference to "Atoms bind" in the fifth movement might have been influenced by Robert Boyle's The Sceptical Chymist.

== Music ==
=== Scoring ===
With a text full of references to musical instruments, the work is scored for a variety of vocal soloists and obbligato instruments, along with strings and basso continuo. For example, "Hark, each Tree" is a duet between, vocally, soprano and bass, and instrumentally, between recorders and violins. These instruments are called for in the text ("box and fir" being the woods from which they are made). However, Purcell did not always follow Brady's cues exactly. He scored the warlike music for two brass trumpets and copper kettle drums instead of the fife mentioned by Brady.

It has been suggested that Purcell himself was the countertenor soloist at the first performance. However, although he was a trained singer, the idea that he sang at this premiere appears to be a misunderstanding of a contemporary review.

=== Musical structures ===
The airs employ a variety of dance forms. "Hark, each tree" is a sarabande. "Thou tun'st this world" is set as a minuet.

The compositional techniques used by Purcell include counterpoint and the ground bass ("Hark, each Tree" is a duet on a ground bass, "In vain the am'rous flute" is set to a passacaglia bass).

== Movements ==
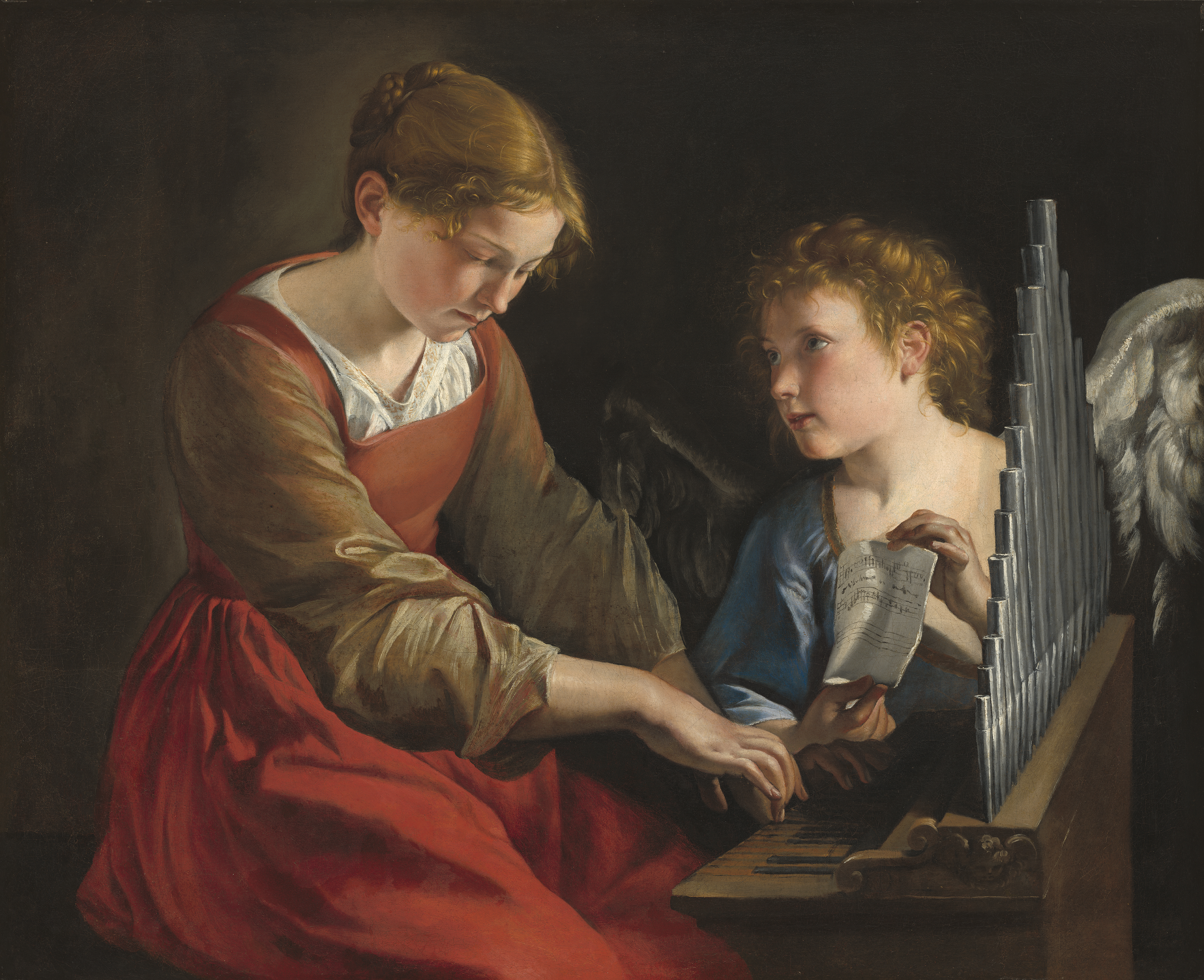
Orazio Gentileschi and Giovanni Lanfranco, Saint Cecilia and an Angel, c. 1617-1618 and c. 1621-1627, National Gallery of Art

The work consists of 13 movements.

1. Symphony (overture): Introduction—Canzona—Adagio—Allegro—Grave—Allegro (repeat)
2. Recitative (bass) and chorus: "Hail! Bright Cecilia"
3. Duet (treble [though range would suggest alto] and bass): "Hark! hark! each tree"
4. Air (countertenor): "'Tis nature's voice"
5. Chorus: "Soul of the world"
6. Air (soprano) and chorus: "Thou tun'st this world"
7. Trio (alto, tenor and bass): "With that sublime celestial lay"
8. Air (bass): "Wondrous machine!"
9. Air (countertenor): "The airy violin"
10. Duet (countertenor and tenor): "In vain the am'rous flute"
11. Air (countertenor): "The fife and all the harmony of war"
12. Duet (two basses): "Let these among themselves contest"
13. Chorus: "Hail! Bright Cecilia, hail to thee"

== Text ==
2. Hail! Bright Cecilia, Hail! fill ev'ry Heart
With Love of thee and thy Celestial Art;
That thine and Musick's Sacred Love
May make the British Forest prove
As Famous as Dodona's Vocal Grove.

3. Hark! hark! each Tree its silence breaks,
The Box and Fir to talk begin!
This in the sprightly Violin
That in the Flute distinctly speaks!
'Twas Sympathy their list'ning Brethren drew,
When to the Thracian Lyre with leafy Wings they flew.

4. 'Tis Natures's Voice; thro' all the moving Wood
Of Creatures understood:
The Universal Tongue to none
Of all her num'rous Race unknown!
From her it learnt the mighty Art
To court the Ear or strike the Heart:
At once the Passions to express and move;
We hear, and straight we grieve or hate, rejoice or love:
In unseen Chains it does the Fancy bind;
At once it charms the Sense and captivates the Mind

5. Soul of the World! Inspir'd by thee,
The jarring Seeds of Matter did agree,
Thou didst the scatter'd Atoms bind,
Which, by thy Laws of true proportion join'd,
Made up of various Parts one perfect Harmony.

6. Thou tun'st this World below, the Spheres above,
Who in the Heavenly Round to their own Music move.

7. With that sublime Celestial Lay
Can any Earthly Sounds compare?
If any Earthly Music dare,
The noble Organ may.
From Heav'n its wondrous Notes were giv'n,
(Cecilia oft convers'd with Heaven,)
Some Angel of the Sacred Choire
Did with his Breath the Pipes inspire;
And of their Notes above the just Resemblance gave,
Brisk without Lightness, without Dulness Grave.

8. Wondrous Machine!
To thee the Warbling Lute,
Though us'd to Conquest, must be forc'd to yield:
With thee unable to dispute.

9. The Airy Violin
And lofty Viol quit the Field;
In vain they tune their speaking Strings
To court the cruel Fair, or praise Victorious Kings.
Whilst all thy consecrated Lays
Are to more noble Uses bent;
And every grateful Note to Heav'n repays
The Melody it lent.

10. In vain the Am'rous Flute and soft Guitarr,
Jointly labour to inspire
Wanton Heat and loose Desire;
Whilst thy chaste Airs do gentle move
Seraphic Flames and Heav'nly Love.

11. The Fife and all the Harmony of War,
In vain attempt the Passions to alarm,
Which thy commanding Sounds compose and charm.

12. Let these amongst themselves contest,
Which can discharge its single Duty best.
Thou summ'st their diff'ring Graces up in One,
And art a Consort of them All within thy Self alone.

13. Hail! Bright Cecilia, Hail to thee!
Great Patroness of Us and Harmony!
Who, whilst among the Choir above
Thou dost thy former Skill improve,
With Rapture of Delight dost see
Thy Favourite Art
Make up a Part
Of infinite Felicity.
Hail! Bright Cecilia, Hail to thee!
Great Patroness of Us and Harmony!

== Publication ==
The work was edited for publication by Edward Francis Rimbault.

== See also ==
- Welcome to all the pleasures
- Ode for St. Cecilia's Day (Handel)

== Notes ==
"With that sublime celestial lay" and "Wond'rous machine" are numbers in praise of the organ.

The organ would count as a member of the speaking forest to which Brady refers. It should be remembered that English organs of the period typically had wooden pipes.
