= Franklin B. Zimmerman =

American musicologist and conductor (born 1923)

Franklin Bershir Zimmerman (born June 20, 1923, Wauneta, Kansas) is an American musicologist and conductor. He has published extensively in the field of Baroque music, and particularly on the English composer, Henry Purcell. He is most known for his complete catalogue of Purcell's works, considered "one of the most crucial contributions to Purcell research". Each work in the catalogue is given a "Z number" which derives from Zimmerman's surname.

Zimmerman was raised in the Catalina Mountains of Arizona, and at 17 served in the U.S. Army in World War II. After service in the South Pacific, he later received his PhD from the University of Southern California in 1958. He has been Professor of Music at Dartmouth College (1964–1967), University of Kentucky (1967–1968) and University of Pennsylvania from 1968 until his retirement. In 1968 he founded the Pennsylvania Pro Musica ensemble.

== Sources ==
- Cummings, David (ed.), "Zimmerman, Franklin", International who's who in music, Routledge, 2000, p. 711. ISBN 0-948875-53-4
- Manning, R. "Guides to research on three early masters", Music and Letters, 1990, Vol. 7, N. 4, pp 552–554
- Kennedy, Michael and Kennedy, Joyce Bourne (eds.),, The Concise Oxford Dictionary of Music, Oxford University Press, 2007 (republished on Answers.com)
- Philadelphia Daily News,, 30 September 1983.
- University of Pennsylvania, Department of Music, Emeritus Professors
