= A Caveat or Warning for Common Cursitors =

16th-century book on vagabonds by Thomas Harman

A Caveat or Warning for Common Cursitors, vulgarly called vagabonds
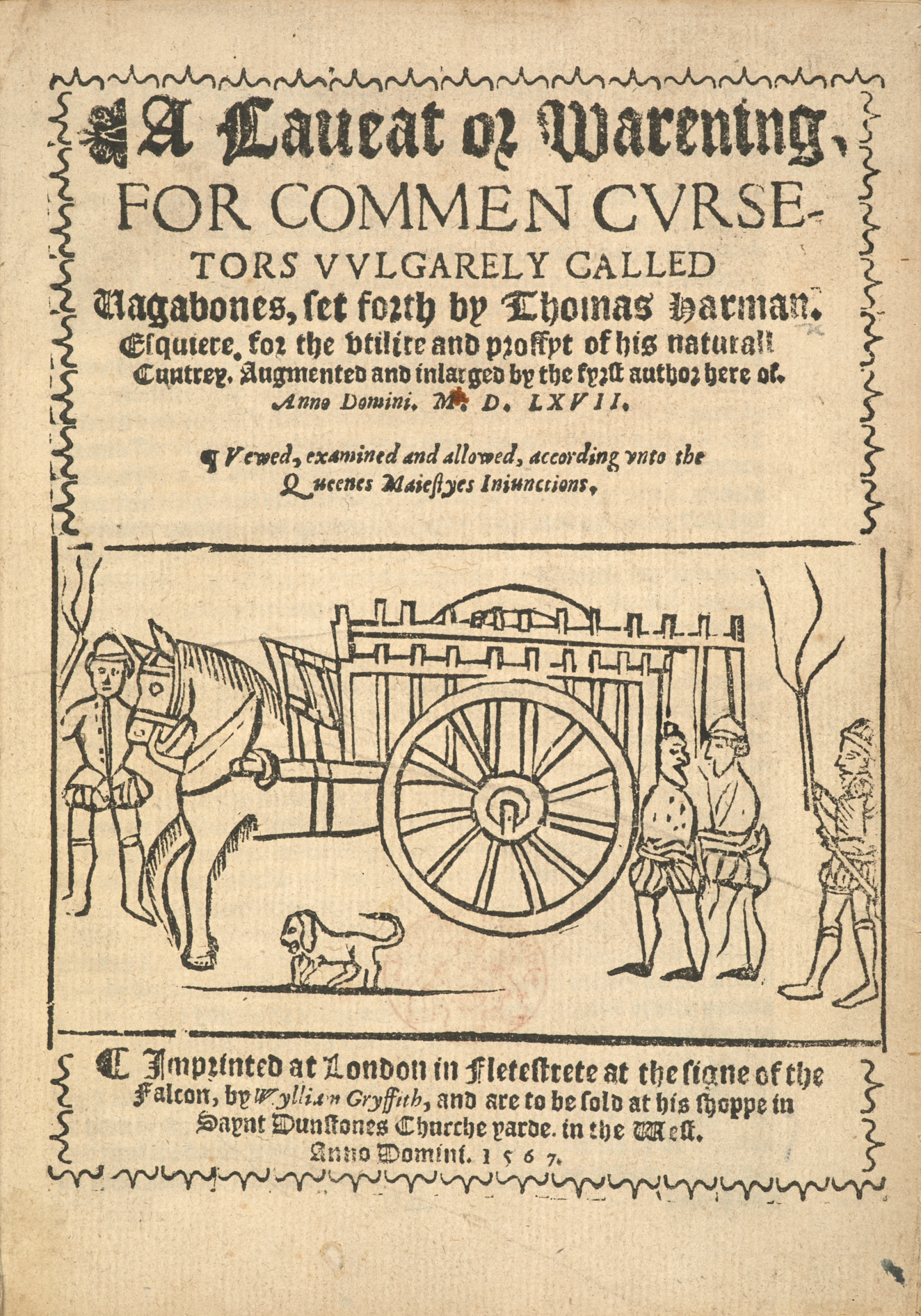
- Title page of the 1567 reprint held by the British Library.
- Author: Thomas Harman
- Language: Early Modern English
- Genre: Rogue literature
- Publisher: William Griffith
- Publication date: 1566
- Publication place: England

A Caveat or Warning for Common Cursitors, vulgarly called vagabonds (shortened as Caveat) was first published in 1566 by Thomas Harman, and although no copies of that edition survive, it must have been popular, because two printers were punished by the Stationers' Company in 1567 for pirated editions. Two editions were published in 1568, and a revised edition in 1573. It is one of the fundamental texts for rogue literature.

Harman claimed to have collected his material directly from interviews with vagabonds themselves. The Caveat contained stories of vagabond life, a description of their society and techniques, a taxonomy of rogues, and a canting dictionary, which were reproduced in later works. Harman's reputation has changed since his work was first republished in the early twentieth century; A. V. Judges described him then as having "all the deftness of the trained sociologist", and the Caveat has been used as a primary source. However, historians have long doubted the reliability of his accounts of vagabond society and the use of cant. Harman has been subject to literary analysis informed by Marx, Freud and Foucault, although historian A.L. Beier suggested these "appear to be fruitful sources of fertile error".

Harman was certainly not a neutral observer; he frequently makes an explicit moral and social judgement about his subjects. These reflect a society in which sexual incontinence (that is, promiscuity) was subject to penalties in the local manor courts, the church courts and by justices of the peace in quarter sessions. It was also a society in ferment over the appropriate response to the increasing number of "masterless men". A large part of the Caveat was included in William Harrison's 16th-century work, Description of England as part of Holinshed's Chronicle.

== Thomas Harman ==
Little is known about Thomas Harman's life. He was from the gentry, described as an esquire in 1557, and with a coat of arms, with which he marked his plate. He inherited land in several parishes in Kent, and resided on an estate near Dartford from 1547. His wife Anne was the daughter of Sir Edward Rogers, who was Comptroller to Queen Elizabeth I. In the Caveat he implies that he was a justice of the peace, but there is no evidence for this. However, in 1550 he was appointed to collect tax in Kent, and in 1554 and 1555 he was a member of the important commission responsible for the Thames and its tributaries from near Southwark to Gravesend. A fellow member of the commission was responsible for the creation of the Bridewell Palace in London, and Harman was clearly acquainted with developments in law enforcement there. The Caveat is dedicated to Bess of Hardwick, although that does not mean that she was known personally to Harman.

There are literary precursors to the Caveat, including John Awdeley's The Fraternity of Vagabonds (1561), of which Harman was aware. It was written in a period when the government in England was increasingly concerned with the perceived problem of "masterless men". Solutions were being sought to the issue of the able-bodied poor. In 1563, the Statute of Artificers was passed "to banish idleness". Poor laws were under review, and a plethora of laws passed against vagrancy, in which the punishments ranged from whipping to branding. In 1559, there was a proposal from a committee (the Privy Council) to restore an act of 1547 that provided for slavery as a punishment.

== Vagabond society ==
Harman set out a taxonomy of rogues, which expanded one sketched out by Awdeley. The structure and processes of this mirrored those of Tudor society, with its hierarchy and sumptuary laws, and the trade guilds, with their apprenticeships and initiations ceremonies.

An example is the ceremony of "stalling a rogue" which Harman describes. In this an Upright Man pours beer over the head of the initiate, with the words, "I, G.P., do stall thee, W.T., to the rogue, and that henceforth it shall be lawful for you to cant . . . for thy living in all places". Such a ceremony is reproduced in later rogue literature, and in the play The Beggars Bush by Beaumont, Fletcher and Massinger, from which it was extracted by Francis Kirkman in The Wits. Bampfylde Moore Carew includes a similar account of his own inauguration as King of the Beggars, and there was a tradition that the graves of members of the Boswell gypsy family were visited annually and beer poured onto them during the eighteenth and nineteenth centuries.

Although his taxonomy has been read as if these roles were fixed, Harman's examples made it clear that many of these roles were modes of begging or crime adopted by the same vagabond from time to time. They also make it clear that many of these villains also had legitimate trades, which they exercised from time to time. This is confirmed by the historical record, which shows that many of those arrested as vagrants were unemployed through no fault of their own. They included domestic servants who had been dismissed, labourers seeking work, or those whose trade required travel, such as pedlars and chapmen (peddler). Harman does seem to have had direct contact with vagabonds, while most of those who wrote later rogue literature were London based writers living in literary circles.

Another area in which Harman has been misunderstood is the place of Egyptians in this vagabond culture. They have no specific place in it, and although he identifies a few individuals as being Egyptians, he describes them generally as having a distinct culture and lifestyle. This is consistent with the attitude to them generally, that they were strange, foreign, little understood and, therefore criminal or at least a danger to the social order. The attitude to the Irish seems to have been similar, though less extreme.

=== Categories of rogue ===
The following is summarised from Harman, with comments in brackets:

Abram Men
or Abraham-men. Feign madness and claim to have been inmates at Bedlam, (where there was an Abraham Ward). If they are not given alms through pity they resort to becoming threatening, and playing on the fear that the mentally ill are dangerous. (They were also known as Bethlem Men, and later Poor Toms. It was believed that the Governors of Bedlam authorized some discharged patients to beg and gave them tin badges, although in 1675 the Governors denied this.)
Autem Morts
Female rogues actually married in church, though not faithful to their husbands. Harman says they go about with children who they send to steal from houses.
Bawdy Baskets
Female pedlars, who travel from house to house. Harman says that only one, who he names, is honest. The rest steal and buy from servants at under value, living with Upright Men, who provide them with protection.
Counterfeit Cranks
Pretend to suffer from the "falling sickness" (epilepsy). They wear dirty clothes, and carry soap so they can use it to foam at the mouth. Some carry false testimonials from ministers in Shropshire. This is one of the modes adopted by Nicholas Blunt.
Demanders for Glimmer
Beggars pretending to have suffered loss by fire, carrying counterfeit licences. Harman says most of these are women, who collect money, and food, which they sell, and able to earn 6 or 7 s. a week. They worked with Upright Men, but were careful not to be seen with them.
Dells
Female rogues who are still virgins. Harman says they are either "Wild Dells", born to doxies, or have lost their parents or been run away from service with some "sharp mistress".
A Doxy
A female rogue whose virginity has been taken by an Upright Man. They are dependent on Upright Men and other rogues. Harman's objection is to their promiscuous lifestyle. He remarks that their breeches serve a dual purpose, as they are also used to carry food they are given.
Dummerers
Beggars pretending dumbness, most of whom Harman says came from Wales. He recounts how, having satisfied himself that a licence produced by one of these was false, he and a surgeon hung him by his wrists from a beam until he spoke. Harman took his money and distributed it to the poor, and the dummerer and his palliard were taken before a Justice, pilloried and whipped.
Fraters
Pretending to be factors or proctors with false licences to collect alms for hospitals.
Hooker or Angler
They carry a long staff and go to houses seeking charity during the day to see what may be stolen. After dark they return and use an iron stick with a hook at the end to reach in through windows to steal clothes and linen, which they hide nearby before taking it to sell.
Jarkmen or Patricos
Harman says that although Awdeley refers these to, neither exists. A Jarkman is supposed to be a forger of licences, but Harman says that these are not made by vagabonds, as he has never come across one capable of writing well enough, but bought by them in towns, "as what can not be had for money?" (Harman is probably right. Several false licences survive, and the historical evidence is that they were mostly produced by provincial schoolmasters, who were notoriously poorly paid. There does seem to have been a real market for these, with the price determined by the content and quality of the licence and the current ferocity of law enforcement). Harman accepts that "Patricos" was the cant word for priest, but says they did not have priests or any ceremony of marriage, as few were married, preferring "natural fellowship and good liking".
Kinchin Coves
Young male rogues. Harman allows them no prospect of reform, saying, "when he groweth unto years, he is better to hang than draw forth".
Kinchin Morts
Young female rogues carried on their mother's back in sheets.
Palliards
Also known as clapperdudgeons. They travel in patched cloaks, with their "wives", seeking alms, but selling what they are given. They work alone but meet in groups at night. Many are Irish and travel with false passports. The Welsh also use herbs to raise wounds on their legs. (Several recipes for this survive. Harman does not explain explicitly the underlying evil of this trick; that it transforms them from sturdy beggars to deserving beggars who cannot work.)
Priggers of Prancers
Horse thieves, using various methods. Harman says they will take the horses at least three score miles off to sell. (The problem of horse theft was significant and laws were passed to require records of all horses sold at markets and fairs, and that two people vouch for the seller.)
Rogues
These are "neither as stout or hardy as the upright man", but live much the same way, begging, stealing and traveling with false passports.
Ruffler
A former soldier or serving man who has chosen a vagabond life, who rob, demand or beg as the opportunity arises. Harman says that after a year or two they become Upright Men, "unless they prevented by twisted hemp" (hanging). The word was used in a 1535 Tudor Act against vagrants.
Swadders or Pedlars
Harman concedes, "not all be evil, but of an indifferent behaviour". His objection is that some bribe and steal, and provide outlets for stolen goods which they are given by Upright Men.
Tinkers or Priggs
Harman does not condemn all tinkers, only those who cheat, steal and spend their money on drink. He says they travel with their "doxies", whom they change frequently.
Upright Man
"some be serving men, artificers, and labouring men traded up in husbandry [who]. . . not minding to live by the sweat of their face," wander through the counties offering the best poor relief. They are skilled professional thieves. Upright Men had authority over other beggars, from whom they could demand money, or other favours. They carried a staff, called a filchman, as a sign of their position. (Harman's phraseology follows a tradition which goes back to, at least, the introduction to and justification for the Statute of Labourers in 1381.)
Walking Morts
Unmarried female rogues, who live by peddling, or begging, but their goods are taken by Upright Men. Harman recounts a conversation with one in which he rebuked her "for her lewd life and beastly behaviour, declaring to her what punishment was prepared and heaped up for in the world to come". Her response was, "...how should I live? None will take me into service. But I labour in harvest-time honestly."
Whipjacks or Freshwater Mariners
These pretend to be shipwrecked sailors, who were likely to be tolerated, and allowed to travel to their supposed homes, or given support. Harman says that most came from Ireland and the west of England, and operated in the counties east of Wiltshire. Some carried counterfeit licences from the Admiralty, which Harman says they bought in Portsmouth for 2s. (Distressed mariners were sometimes licensed to seek alms, as were the relatives of those whose relatives were kidnapped by corsairs. False licences, or, in cant, "jarks" were popular, as they were difficult to check.)
Wild Rogues
Rogues born to rogues, ("beastly begotten in barn or bushes"), and by nature more given to "knavery". Harman says that questioning one he replied that his father and grandfather had been beggars, "and he must needs be one by good reason".

=== Canting Dictionary ===
Harman includes a short dictionary of cant words. His introduction to that is characteristic of his literary style and social attitude:- "Here I set before the good reader the lewd, lousy language of these loitering lusks and lazy lorels, wherewith they buy and sell the common people as they pass through the country."

The value of the dictionary to the "good reader" was probably minimal. Cant has only been found in court records six times, all after Harman and Awdeley, and the extent to which it was actually used is unclear.

However, it was a goldmine for later writers, who various copied it, expanded on it, or used it to add colour to pamphlets and plays. Harman's taxonomy is reproduced in William Harrison's Description of England, contained in Holinshed's Chronicles (1577, 1587), as history, and extensively copied by in rogue literature, including Thomas Dekker, in Lantern and Candlelight (1608), Richard Head The English Rogue (1665), and The Life and Adventures of Bampfylde Moore Carew' (1745).

=== Rogue Tales ===
Harman claimed that having for twenty years kept a house on the main road to London, and having through sickness been at his home much, he had learned how to extract information from those vagabonds who called seeking alms. His accounts show similarities to the depositions taken by Justices of the Peace examining cases, and have been assumed to have been the same kind of first hand account collected by researchers such as Henry Mayhew. However, Harman is not a disinterested observer or reporter. He regards himself as a skilled interrogator, and the information to have been extracted against the will of those providing it. Although there is no suggestion he did so frequently, he approvingly reports his own use of violence to extract a confession in one case. He justifies his expansion of Awdeley's work by saying it was insufficient to protect people. His work is aimed at assisting law enforcement, and ridding the country of rogues, so that parishes can concentrate their spending on the relief of the deserving poor.

Also, although he denies it, he writes with style, being fond of alliteration, and within a tradition of vulgar writing in chapbooks and jest books, which included crude and sexual references. Such writing was at the time widely acceptable; Sir Thomas More, and Erasmus wrote jests, the latter including a fart joke, and on her deathbed in 1603 courtiers read to Queen Elizabeth from the jest book A Hundred Merry Tales, (1526).

Two-thirds of the Caveat is taken up with stories, and in the second edition he says he has added more. The stories are often comic, involving tricks, and have some moral element. A prime example is the man who rescues a "mort", having extracted a promise of sexual favours for doing so. She defers the reward, in the meantime informs local "gossips", and the lecher is caught by his wife and her friends with his pants literally down and soundly beaten by them.

=== Nicholas Jennings ===
Harman lists by name 215 Upright Men, Rogues and Palliards in separate lists. Of these 18 have been identified with named individuals punished as vagabonds in contemporary court records by Aydelotte. He also found about a dozen more punished for other offences. Taking into account the possibility of coincidences, the likelihood or apprehension, and the use of false names, this does suggest that some of Harman's information was reliable.

The most significant and detailed account given by Harman concerns a man named by him in his list of rogues as "Nicholas Blunt (alias Nicholas Jennings, a counterfeit crank) ". Harman recounts Blunt's appearance at his lodgings in Whitefriars on All Hallows Day 1566 seeking alms, naked from the waist upwards, in ragged dirty clothes, his face smeared with fresh blood feigning the "falling sickness" (probably palsy or epilepsy). Being suspicious Harman questioned him, and Blunt claimed to have been suffering from the falling sickness for eight years, and to have been discharged from Bedlam two weeks before, after being an inmate there two years. Harman checked with the keeper of the hospital who denied this, and then had Blunt followed by two boys from his printers, who saw him beg all day, renewing the blood from a bladder, and putting fresh mud on his clothes. They then followed him to Newington, south of the river, where the Constable apprehended him. On being searched he was found to have collected 13s. 3½d. (a labourer would have earned 6d. a day). He was also stripped and found to be fit and well, but escaped naked across the fields in the dark. Having then spent a period begging in the guise of a sailor whose ship and cargo had been lost at sea, and then as "Nicholas Jennings", a well-dressed hatter who had come to London for work, Blunt happened to accost Harman's printer on New Year's Day 1567. The printer recognised him and had him arrested. After denials and another escape attempt Blunt made a confession and was found to have "a pretty house" in Newington, "well furnished" and with a wife living there. Blunt's punishment combined the old penal techniques of physical punishment and public exposure, with the modern theory of rehabilitation through labour. For the latter he was imprisoned in the new Bridewell. For the former he was whipped at a cart's tail through the streets of London, and put in the pillory at Cheapside dressed in both his "ugly and handsome attire". His picture was exhibited there, and while he was whipped, and also outside his house, and kept at the Bridewell "for a monument".

We know that at least the apprehension and whipping took place as there is a record of it in the Repertory of the Court of Aldermen for 13 January 1567. There are also records there of two others admitting similar crimes, in 1547 and 1517.

Several illustrations of Blunt's tale appear in the Caveat. Both these and his story are repeated in later rogue literature. These illustrations and later texts often describe Blunt as an Upright Man, which Harman does not in his text.

- 'to filch', to beat, to strike, to rob.
- 'to maund', to ask or require.
- 'to cant', to speak.
- 'to prig', to ride.

== See also ==
- Thieves' cant

== Sources ==
=== Biographical ===
- Christopher Burlinson, 'Harman, Thomas (fl. 1547–1567)', Oxford Dictionary of National Biography, Oxford University Press, Sept 2004; online edn, Oct 2006, accessed 4 Aug 2008

=== Text ===
The Caveat is available online to subscribers to EEBO, and at Google Book Search. (The latter comprises page-images of an 1814 reprint of the 1573 edition.)

The text is included in:

- Judges, A.V., The Elizabethan Underworld, (London, 1930 & 1965), is based on the third edition, but includes parts of the second and third.
- Salgado, S., Cony-Catchers and Bawdy Baskets; an Anthology of Elizabethan Low Life, (Harmondsworth, 1972)
- Kinney, A.F., Rogues, Vagabonds and Sturdy Beggars, (Amherst, 1990) contains the second edition.

=== Analysis ===
- Aydelotte, F, Elizabethan Rogues and Vagabonds, (Oxford 1913, reprinted London & New York 1967) contains an uncritical view, but remains a good introduction to rogue literature
- Carroll, W.C., Fat King, Lean Beggar: Representations of Poverty in the Age of Shakespeare, (Ithaca, 1996) analyses Harman and other literature.
- Beier, L., 'On the boundaries of the New and Old Historicism: Thomas Harman and the literature of Roguery', English Literary Renaissance, vol. 33, 2003, pp. 181–200, presents an analysis of the different readings of Harman from the point of view of a historian with knowledge of the period.
- Coleman, J., A History of Cant and Slang Dictionaries. Volume I 1567–1784, (Oxford, 2004) analyses Harman's list in the context of slang lexicography
- Woodbridge, L., 'Jest Books, the Literature of Roguery, and the Vagrant Poor in Renaissance England', English Literary Renaissance, vol. 33, 2003, pp. 201–210, puts the Caveat in the context of English vulgar literature.
- Fumerton, F., 'Making Vagrancy (In)visible: The Economics of Disguise in the Early Modern Rogue Pamphlets', English Literary Renaissance, vol. 33, 2003, pp. 211–227, analyses the difficulty Harman and other early modern writers had in distinguishing the rogue from the itinerant poor.

=== Historical context ===
- Salgado, G., The Elizabethan Underworld, (London, 1977)
- Beier, A.L. Masterless Men: The Vagrancy Problem in England 1560–1640 (London, 1985) ISBN 978-0-416-39020-9
- Beier, A.L. 'Vagrants and the Social Order in Elizabethan England', Past & Present, LXIV (1974)pp. 3–29
- Mayall, D., 'Egyptians and Vagabonds: Representations of the Gypsy in Early Modern Official and Rogue Literature', Immigrants and Minorities, vol. 16, No. 3, November 1997, pp. 55–82
- Slack, P.A. 'Vagrants and Vagrancy in England 1598–1664', Economic History Review 2nd Series XXVII (1974) pp. 360–79
