= The Spanish Viceroy =

Problem play of English Renaissance drama

Premiere
- Date: December 1624

The Spanish Viceroy is a problem play of English Renaissance drama. Originally a work by Philip Massinger dating from 1624, it was controversial in its own era, and may or may not exist today in altered form.

== History ==
=== 1624 ===
In December 1624, the King's Men got into trouble with Sir Henry Herbert, the Master of the Revels, because they performed a play, The Spanish Viceroy, without first obtaining Herbert's license. This step was bound to get them into trouble: Herbert's job was to oversee and censor every play acted in the London theatres, and he was zealous in doing his job, maintaining his authority, and collecting his fees.

The outcome was unsurprising, given the way the system of control worked. On 20 December 1624, the King's Men provided Herbert with a "submission", a written apology, signed by each actor who had taken part in the offending performance. The cast included Robert Benfield, George Birch, John Lowin, Thomas Pollard, John Rice, Richard Robinson, William Rowley, John Shank, Richard Sharpe, Eliard Swanston, and Joseph Taylor. (Herbert copied the submission into his office book in 1633, a sign of the importance he assigned to it.)

=== 1628 ===
On 6 May 1628, another Massinger play was duly licensed, a work titled The Honour of Women. This second play had no immediately obvious connection with The Spanish Viceroy; the connection between them would only appear a quarter-century later. The Honour of Women is one of the plays that was destroyed in the kitchen of John Warburton. (His cook mistook his manuscript collection for scrap paper, and used it up lighting fires and lining pie pans. Some 50 manuscripts, many of them unique copies of plays, were destroyed.)

=== 1653 ===
On 9 September 1653, stationer Humphrey Moseley entered a large number of plays into the Stationers' Register; one of the dramas he registered on that date was titled The Spanish Viceroy, or the Honour of Women. This would appear to indicate that Massinger reworked his 1624 Spanish Viceroy into a new form, which was licensed for performance in 1628 as The Honour of Women.

Moseley, however, had a habit of skimping on registration fees by deliberately confusing titles and subtitles, and registering two plays for the price of one. He did this for The Lovers' Progress, The Bashful Lover, The Guardian, and A Very Woman, other plays in the Massinger canon. So there is no guarantee that Spanish Viceroy and Honour of Women were the same play after all. Scholars have been divided on the issue of whether these titles refer to one play, or two.

== Gondomar and Osuna ==
Early critics developed the argument that The Spanish Viceroy was a play about the Count of Gondomar, the diplomat who had served as Spain's ambassador to England to 1622. The King's Men had made a sensation in August 1624 with their staging of Thomas Middleton's A Game at Chess, with its satiric portrayal of Gondomar. In this view, the King's Men attempted to repeat their controversial success of August 1624 with a similar play in December.

There is some reason to think that controversial plays like A Game at Chess were backed by interested factions at Court, and that the King's Men would not have staged such plays without some measure of official support. (Officials supported plays on controversial subjects when it was in their interest to do so, as with Sir John van Olden Barnavelt and The Late Lancashire Witches.) By this reasoning, the actors dared to stage the unlicensed Spanish Viceroy because they had protection from some segment of the Jacobean power structure.

The Gondomar hypothesis regarding The Spanish Viceroy is, however, speculative, with no firm evidence to support it.

A more modern and perhaps more plausible hypothesis suggests that The Spanish Viceroy was about Pedro Giron, Duke of Osuna, who had served as the viceroy of Sicily and Naples. Osuna was suspected of planning to set himself up as king of an independent kingdom. He was recalled to Spain in 1620, and put on trial; he died in prison. Osuna's story would have been of current interest in 1624, and could have suited the English public's anti-Spanish mood.

== A Very Woman ==
Neither The Spanish Viceroy nor The Honour of Women has survived under its original title. Yet commentators also developed the hypothesis that The Spanish Viceroy exists in an altered form, as the extant 1634 play A Very Woman. This is one of Massinger's collaborations with John Fletcher, and the play does feature a Spanish viceroy of Sicily as a supporting character. Yet plays are normally named after their protagonists, or on rare occasion the protagonists of their comic subplots; they are not named after supporting characters. This makes A Very Woman seem an unlikely candidate for The Spanish Viceroy.

A Very Woman also has nothing to do with the Count of Gondomar or the Duke of Osuna.
