= The Lovers' Progress =

Play by John Fletcher and Philip Massinger

The Lovers' Progress (also known as The Wandering Lovers, Cleander, or Lisander and Calista) is an early seventeenth-century stage play, a tragicomedy written by John Fletcher and Philip Massinger. As its multiple titles indicate, the play has a complex history and has been a focus of controversy among scholars and critics.

== Facts and conclusions ==
The historical facts pertinent to the play, in chronological order, are these:

- A play titled The Wandering Lovers was licensed for performance by Sir Henry Herbert, the Master of the Revels, on 6 December 1623, as a work by John Fletcher. It was acted at Court on 1 January 1634. No play with that title has survived.
- A play by Massinger titled The Tragedy of Cleander was similarly licensed on 7 May 1634, and performed soon after by the King's Men at the Blackfriars Theatre. Queen Henrietta Maria saw it there on 13 May that year. (The Lovers' Progress could be called a tragedy from the point of view of the character Cleander, since Cleander dies in Act IV.)
- Also in 1634, Sir Humphrey Mildmay noted in his diary that he had seen a play he called Lisander and Calista. Lisander and Calista are characters in The Lovers' Progress.
- A play titled The Lovers' Progress was published in the first Beaumont and Fletcher folio of 1647. The Prologue and Epilogue to the play indicate that this extant text is a revision by another hand of an original work by Fletcher.
- On 9 September 1653, bookseller and publisher Humphrey Moseley entered a play he called The Wandering Lovers, or The Painter into the Stationers' Register. No work with this combined title and subtitle is known. Moseley had a habit, however, of exploiting the confusion inherent in titles and subtitles to register two separate plays for a single fee. (For examples, see The Bashful Lover, The Guardian, and A Very Woman.) The implication is that Moseley's entry refers to two separate plays, the Wandering Lovers that was licensed in December 1623, and Massinger's lost play The Painter.
- The Lovers' Progress was reprinted in the second Beaumont and Fletcher folio of 1679; in that collection it is supplied with a cast list from the original production by the King's Men, a list that cites Joseph Taylor, John Lowin, Robert Benfield, John Underwood, Thomas Pollard, Richard Sharpe, George Birch, and John Thompson. This list has been interpreted to indicate a premier production of The Lovers' Progress in the 1623–24 period, after the death of King's Man Nicholas Tooley in June 1623 but before the death of John Underwood in October 1624 – or around the time of The Wandering Lovers.

The consensus interpretation of this evidence is that Fletcher wrote a solo play titled The Wandering Lovers, which was acted in late 1623 or early 1624 by the King's Men. A decade later, Massinger revised that play into a new version, alternatively known as Cleander or Lisander and Calista. This revised version was later published in the Beaumont and Fletcher folios of 1647 and 1679 as The Lovers' Progress.

== Authorship ==
Given the major stylistic and textual differences in the habits of Fletcher and Massinger, scholars have been able to distinguish the two men's hands in the existing version. Cyrus Hoy, in his wide-ranging study of authorship problems in Fletcher's canon, argued for this division:

Massinger – Act I, scene 1; Act III, 1 and 4; Act IV; Act V;
Fletcher – Act II; Act III, 2–3 and 5–6;
Massinger and Fletcher – Act I, 2 (Massinger, first half, to Dorilaus's entrance; Fletcher, the remainder).

== Sources ==
The primary source for the plot of The Lovers' Progress was the Histoire trage-comique de nostre temps, sous les noms de Lysandre et de Caliste, a popular prose romance by Vital d'Audiguier that was first published in 1615 and often reprinted. The first English translation appeared in 1617.

== Islip ==
The text of The Lovers' Progress in the 1647 folio was one of those set into print by Susan Islip – a rare instance of a woman printer in that era. Widows sometimes continued the businesses of their late husbands; among booksellers, Alice Moseley, widow of Humphrey Moseley, and Elizabeth Allde, widow of Edward Allde, are two among a number of possible examples. For printer/widows like Islip, Ellen Cotes, widow of Richard Cotes and sister-in law of Thomas Cotes, can be cited, along with Alice Warren and Sarah Griffin.

== Synopsis ==
The play is set in France. Its plot depends on an unusual narrative structure: a standard love triangle, tripled. There are three female characters, and each enjoys (or suffers) the romantic attentions of two men. Two, Calista and Olinda, are gentlewomen. Calista has already made a choice between her two suitors, and is married to Cleander; but her other suitor, Cleander's close friend Lisander, is still in love with her, and she still loves him. Calista's friend Olinda, however, cannot choose between Lidian (who is Calista's brother) and Clarange. (Lidian and Clarange are also close friends.) In despair, Olinda sends both her suitors away, and states that she will marry the man who returns to her last. The two men, applying their own culture's standard of judgement to this odd stricture, decide to settle the matter quickly – with a duel. The survivor will marry Olinda.

The third woman is a servant, Calista's waiting woman Clarinda. She is identified as "a lustful wench," and in modern terms could be called a sexually liberated woman; but the prevailing norms of her society, and her dependent social place, force her to conceal her active sexuality. Clarinda's subplot inverts and mocks the conventions of courtly love that the main-plot characters take seriously; she has a foolish suitor named Malfort that she manipulates – allowing him to kiss her foot, and later, her hand – while she enjoys a sexual relationship with Leon, her pretended cousin.

Lisander is not only Cleander's friend, but becomes something of a hero to his family. Lisander saves Calista's father Dorilaus when the old man is set upon by bandits; and he later resolves the duel between Clarange and Calista's brother Lidian. (Serving as Clarange's second, he fights along with, and is wounded with, the others; but he then brings the duel to a halt by appealing to the long-standing friendship between the principals.) Lisander asks for a clandestine meeting with Calista, and Clarinda facilitates it, for her own reasons. Calista and Lisander meet quietly in the night; Calista is still in love with Lisander, and he tries to steer their relationship toward a sexual culmination – but Calista stands upon her honor and refuses. Cleander almost catches the two together; and while Lisander is sneaking out of the sleeping house, he trips and discharges his pistol, waking everyone; but he is not caught.

Dorilaus and Cleander visit a familiar inn, and are surprised to learn that their old acquaintance, the inn's Host, has recently died. Yet they hear him sing a song, and then meet his ghost. Cleander is superstitiously moved and frightened by the incident, and sees it as a malevolent omen; he asks the ghost to warn him if he is soon to die – and the ghost agrees.

Calista suspects Clarinda's lapse from chastity, and confronts her; but Clarinda boldly responds by threatening to expose her mistress's meeting with Lisander. Calista is deeply distressed – but decides again to stand upon her honor. She dismisses Clarinda from her service, and dares her to do her worst. This contradicts Clarinda's plans and expectations; but she manages to retain her place by appealing to Cleander's brother Beronte. (Clarinda says that "Monsieur Beronte my Lords Brother is / Oblig'd unto me for a private favour"...leaving the audience to speculate of the nature of that favor.)

Lisander gets involved in serious trouble: he kills two men in another duel, one of whom is a favorite of the King; and he must flee for his life. He leaves his broken sword behind him on the "field of honor;" it is picked up and repaired by Leon. The ghost of the Host comes to Cleander and warns him that his time has come. Cleander becomes aware of the affair between Leon and Clarinda; in a confrontation, Leon kills Cleander with Lisander's sword. Clarinda has him leave the sword behind, so that Lisander will be suspected; and Clarinda moves to revenge herself on Calista by exposing her meeting with Lisander. Calista must face the law as an apparent accessory to her husband's murder.

Lidian has endured a change of heart after being wounded in the duel with Clarange (a feature typical of the dramaturgy of Fletcher and Massinger). He is now living in the countryside as a hermit. Clarange comes to him disguised as a friar, and convinces him that he, Clarange, is dead. Lidian goes to Olinda to give her the news and comfort her; Clarange follows, and by being the second to arrive claims Olinda's hand by her own stricture. Lidian is outraged, feeling he's been tricked.

The whole plot comes to a head in the final trial scene. The King of France himself has come to rule on Calista's case. Clarinda present her false accusation; but Lisander surprises everyone by appearing in person to defend Calista's reputation. And Leon, captured and now repentant over his killing of Cleander, confesses everything. The evidence indicates that Lisander was the wronged party in the duel with the King's favorite, and King is convinced to pardon him; he "sentences" Lisander to marry the widowed Calista after a year of mourning. Olinda's fate is also resolved; it turns out that Clarange is not just a pretended friar but a real one. Having chosen the religious life, he yields his claim on Olinda to Lidian. Clarinda and Leon are left to their fates before the law.

The play is one of the relatively few works in Fletcher's canon that was not revived after the theatres re-opened in 1660. The scene of the innkeeper's ghost, III, v, is one aspect of the play that has attracted notice from critics and readers.

On the play's title: the 17th-century folios rendered the title without punctuation: no apostrophe in Lovers. Editors of the 18th and 19th centuries generally chose to take "lover" as singular, and titled the play The Lover's Progress. Modern editors tend to prefer the more accurate plural – The Lovers' Progress – since the drama certainly offers its audience more than one lover. For a similar case, see Beggars' Bush.
