= Thieves' cant =

Cant used by various peoples in English-speaking countries

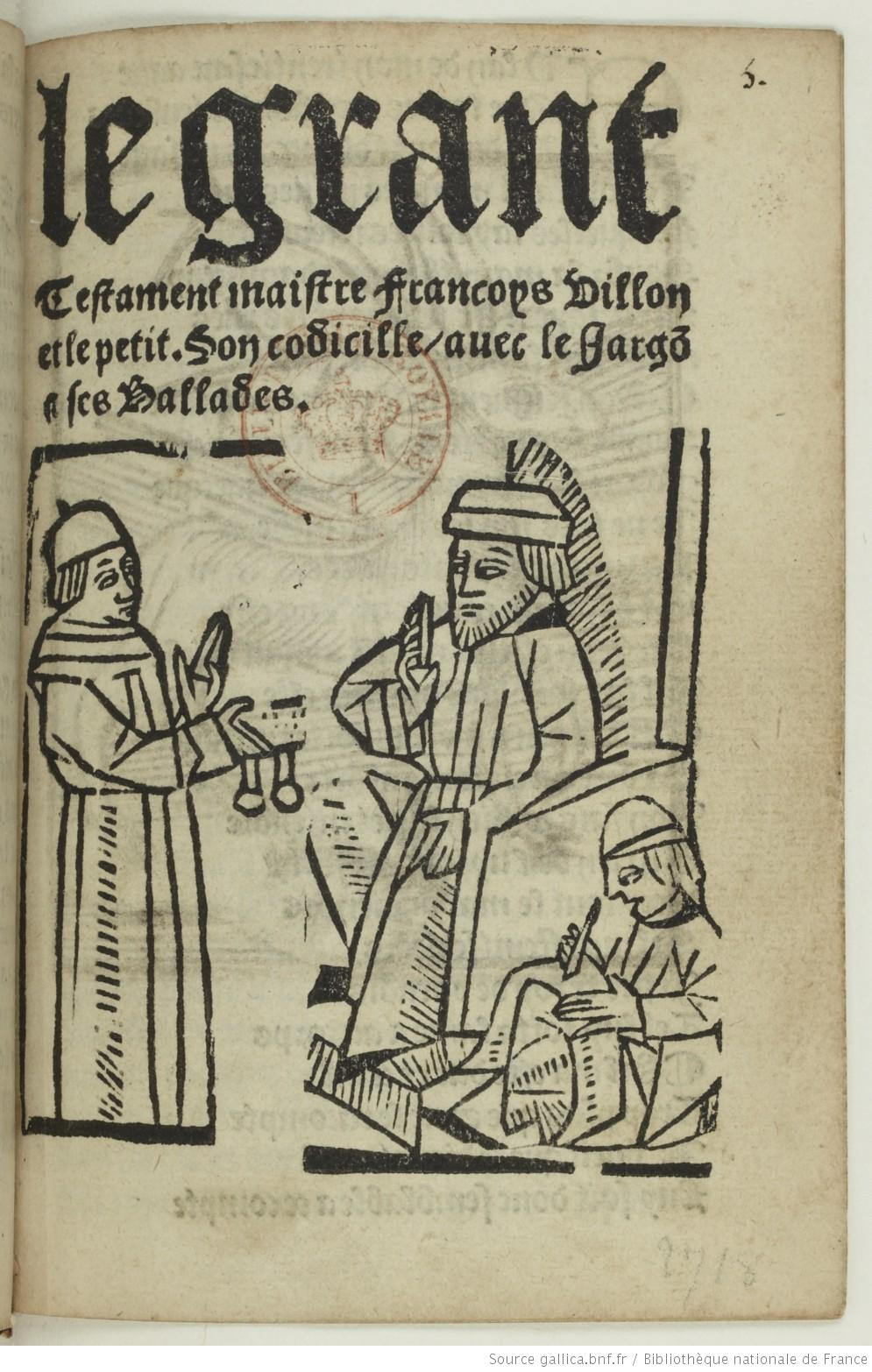
"Le Grant Testament Maistre Françoys Villon et le Petit. Son Codicille avec le Jargon et ses Ballades." (c. 1500) It is one of the earliest examples of the use of thieves' cant in modern times.

Thieves' cant (also known as thieves' argot, rogues' cant, or peddler's French) is a cant, cryptolect, or argot which was formerly used by thieves, beggars, and hustlers of various kinds in Great Britain and to a lesser extent in other English-speaking countries. It is now mostly obsolete and used in literature and fantasy role-playing, although individual terms continue to be used in the criminal subcultures of Britain and the United States.

== History ==
Cant is a common feature of rogue literature of the Elizabethan era in England, in both pamphlets and theatre. It was said by Samuel Rid to have been devised around 1530 by two vagabond leaders – Giles Hather, of the "Egyptians", and Cock Lorell, of the "Quartern of Knaves" – at The Devil's Arse, a cave in Derbyshire, "to the end that their cozenings, knaveries and villainies might not so easily be perceived and known". Thomas Harman, a justice of the peace, included examples in his account A Caveat or Warning for Common Cursitors, first published in 1566. He collected his information from vagabonds he interrogated at his home in Essex. He also called it "pedlars' French" or "pelting speech", and was told that it had been invented as a secret language some 30 years earlier. The earliest records of canting words are included in The Highway to the Spitalfields by Robert Copland c. 1536. Copland and Harman were used as sources by later writers. A spate of rogue literature started in 1591 with Robert Greene's series of five pamphlets on cozenage and coney-catching. These were continued by other writers, including Thomas Middleton, in The Black Book and Thomas Dekker, in The Bellman of London (1608), Lantern and Candlelight (1608), and O per se O (1612). Cant was included together with descriptions of the social structure of beggars, the techniques of thieves including coney-catching, gull-groping, and gaming tricks, and the descriptions of low-lifes of the kind which have always been popular in literature.

Harman included a canting dictionary which was copied by Thomas Dekker and other writers. That such words were known to a wide audience is evidenced by the use of cant words in Jacobean theatre. Middleton and Dekker included it in The Roaring Girl, or Moll Cut-Purse (1611). It was used extensively in The Beggars' Bush, a play by Francis Beaumont, John Fletcher and Philip Massinger, first performed in 1622, but possibly written c. 1614. The play remained popular for two centuries, and the canting section was extracted as The Beggars Commonwealth by Francis Kirkman as one of the drolls he published for performance at markets, fairs and camps.

The influence of this work can be seen from the independent life taken on by the "Beggar King Clause", who appears as a real character in later literature. The ceremony for anointing the new king was taken from Thomas Harman and described as being used by Gypsies in the nineteenth century. Bampfylde Moore Carew, who published his picaresque Life in 1745, claimed to have been chosen to succeed "Clause Patch" as King of the Beggars, and many editions of his work included a canting dictionary. Such dictionaries, often based on Harman's, remained popular, including The Canting Academy, or Devils Cabinet opened, by Richard Head (1673), and BE's Dictionary of the Canting Crew (1699).

== Sources ==
It was commonly believed that cant developed from Romany. Etymological research now suggests a substantial correlation between Romany words and cant, and equivalents, in many European languages. However, in England, Scotland, and Wales this does not apply. The Egyptians, as they were known, were a separate group from the standard vagabonds, and cant was fully developed within 50 years of their first arrival in England. Comparison of Romany words in the Winchester Confessions taken in 1616 with modern Welsh Romani show high commonality. This record also distinguished between Romany and Cant words and again the attributions of the words to the different categories is consistent with later records.

There is doubt as to the extent to which the words in canting literature were taken from street usage, or were adopted by those wishing to show that they were part of a real or imagined criminal underworld. The transmission has almost certainly been in both directions. The Winchester Confessions indicate that Roma who were engaged in criminal activities, or those who were associated with them and had a good knowledge of their language, were using cant, but as a separate vocabulary – Angloromani was used for day to day matters, while cant was used for criminal activities. A thief in 1839 claimed that the cant he had seen in print was nothing like the cant then used by gypsies, thieves and beggars. He also said that each of these used distinct vocabularies, which overlapped; the gypsies having a cant word for everything, and the vagrants using a lower style than the thieves.

== Examples ==
- ken – house
- bob ken – a house that can easily be robbed
- boozing ken – alehouse
- stauling ken – a house that will receive stolen goods
- lag – water; as a verb, penal transportation
- bene – good
- patrico – priest
- autem – church
- darkmans – night
- glymmer – fire
- mort – woman
- cove – man
- cully – a victim
- bung – a purse
- fence – a person who buys stolen goods
- fencing cully – a person who will receive stolen goods
- fambles – hands; also goods that are probably stolen
- bite – to cheat or cozen
- prog – meat
- scowre – to run away
- cuttle-bung – a knife with a curved blade
- foin – a pickpocketing technique in which conversation and deception are used to steal a purse from a victim; also someone who uses this technique
- nip – pickpocketing by slashing and palming a purse; also a person who uses this technique
- knuckle – a young pickpocket
- stall – a person who identifies and manoeuvres a victim so that their purse can be stolen
- bulk the cull to the right! – an instruction by a pickpocket to a stall to distract a cully by striking them on their right breast, so that their purse may be stolen
- budge – a person who breaks into houses to allow entry for their gang.

== Equivalent of thieves' cant in other languages ==
- Bargoens, Netherlands
- Fenya, Russia
- Germanía, Spain
- Grypsera, Poland
- Rotwelsch, Germany
- Coa, Chile

== See also ==
- A New Dictionary of the Terms Ancient and Modern of the Canting Crew
- Rhyming slang – When words are replaced by their rhymes
- Lunfardo – Argot of the Río de la Plata region
- Nihali – Language spoken in India
- Polari – Form of slang
- Tsotsitaal and Camtho – Variety of mixed languages mainly spoken in the townships of Gauteng province
- Šatrovački – Serbo-Croatian argot

By ISO 639-3 code
Enter an ISO code to find the corresponding language article.
