= Abraham-men =

Historic class of beggars

The Abraham-men (also Abram-men or Abraham coves) were a class of beggars claiming to be lunatics allowed out of restraint, in the Tudor and Stuart periods in England.

The phrase normally refers to the practice of beggars pretending that they were patients discharged from the Abraham ward at Bedlam. The phrase can be traced back as far as 1561, when it was given as one of The Fraternity of Vagabonds, by John Awdeley. It also appears in the taxonomy of rogues given by Thomas Harman, which was copied by later writers of rogue literature. The author of O Per Se O (1612) reported that Abram-men made marks on their arms with 'burnt paper, piss and gunpowder' to show they had been in Bedlam Hospital: "some dance, but keep no measure; others leap up and down". The phrase Abraham-men also appears as a disguise for Edgar in King Lear (1604–05) and John Fletcher's Beggar's Bush. They were called anticks or God's minstrels, and later Poor Toms, from the popular song "Tom of Bedlam". John Aubrey, the antiquary, said they were common before the English Civil War, and wore a badge of tin on their left arms, an ox horn around their necks, a long staff and fantastical clothing. However, the badge seems to have been in myth. It may have been convenient theatrical property. Richard Head wrote in The Canting Academy, or Devils Cabinet opened (1673) that they:

[...] used to array themselves with party-coloured ribbons, tape in their hats, a fox-tail hanging down, a long stick with streamers, and beg alms; but for all their seeming madness, they had wit enough to steal as they went along.

In 1675 the governors of Bedlam issued a public notice in the London Gazette:

Whereas several vagrant persons do wander about [...] pretending themselves to be lunatics under cure in the Hospital of Bethlem commonly called Bedlam, with brass plates about their arms and inscriptions thereon: These are to give notice that there is no such liberty given to any patients kept in the said Hospital for their cure, neither is any such plate as a distinction or mark put upon any lunatic during their being there, or when discharged thence. And that the same is a false pretence, to colour their wandering and begging, and to deceive the people.

Bedlam specialised in the care of mental illness from 1403, and remained the only such hospital in England until the 17th century. There cannot have been many genuine ex-inmates. In 1598 there were only 20 patients there, one who had been there over 25 years and others for several years.

In 1737 the Dictionary of Thieving Slang still described Abram-men as "shabby Beggars, patched and trick'd up with Ribbons, Red-Tape, Fox-tails, Rags of various Colours; pretending to be besides themselves, to palliate their Thefts of Poultry, Linnen, &c. A sort of itinerant Hedge-Robbers, and Strippers of Children, &c."
