= Gilderoy =

Gilderoy may refer to:

- Gilderoy Scamp, King of the Romani and bare knuckle boxer
- Gilderoy, Victoria, a locality in Victoria, Australia
- Gilderoy (outlaw) (executed 1636), Scottish outlaw and blackmailer
- Gilderoy Lockhart, fictional wizard in the Harry Potter series
