= Slang =

Vocabulary of an informal register

Slang is vocabulary (words or phrases) common in everyday conversation in an informal register of a language, particularly in nonstandard dialects, but avoided in formal writing and speech. It also often refers to the language exclusively used by the members of particular in-groups in order to establish group identity, exclude outsiders, or both. The word itself came about in the 18th century and has been defined in multiple ways since its conception, with no single technical usage in linguistics.

== Etymology of the word slang ==
In its earliest attested use (1756), the word slang referred to the vocabulary of "low" or "disreputable" people. By the early nineteenth century, it was no longer exclusively associated with disreputable people, but continued to be applied to usages below the level of standard educated speech. In Scots dialect it meant "talk, chat, gossip", as used by Aberdeen poet William Scott in 1832: "The slang gaed on aboot their war'ly care." In northern English dialect it meant "impertinence, abusive language".

The origin of the word "slang" is unclear. It was first used in print around 1800 to refer to the language of the disreputable and criminal classes in London, though its usage likely dates back further. A Scandinavian origin has been proposed (compare, for example, Norwegian slengenavn, which means "nickname"), but based on "date and early associations" is discounted by the Oxford English Dictionary. Jonathon Green, however, agrees with the possibility of a Scandinavian origin, suggesting the same root as that of sling, which means "to throw", and noting that slang is thrown language – a quick and honest way to make your point.

== Defining slang ==
Linguists have no simple and clear definition of slang but agree that it is a constantly changing linguistic phenomenon present in every subculture worldwide. Some argue that slang exists because we must come up with ways to define new experiences that have surfaced with time and modernity. Attempting to remedy the lack of a clear definition, however, Bethany K. Dumas and Jonathan Lighter argue that an expression should be considered "true slang" if it meets at least two of the following criteria:

- It lowers, if temporarily, "the dignity of formal or serious speech or writing"; in other words, it is likely to be considered in those contexts a "glaring misuse of register".
- Its use implies that the user is familiar with whatever is referred to, or with a group of people who are familiar with it and use the term.
- "It's a taboo term in ordinary discourse with people of a higher social status or greater responsibility."
- It replaces "a well-known conventional synonym." This is done primarily to avoid discomfort caused by the conventional synonym or discomfort or annoyance caused by having to elaborate further.

Michael Adams remarks that "[Slang] is liminal language... it is often impossible to tell, even in context, which interests and motives it serves... slang is on the edge." Slang dictionaries, collecting thousands of slang entries, offer a broad, empirical window into the motivating forces behind slang.

While many forms of lexicon may be considered low-register or "sub-standard", slang remains distinct from colloquial and jargon terms because of its specific social contexts. While viewed as inappropriate in formal usage, colloquial terms are typically considered acceptable in speech across a wide range of contexts, whereas slang tends to be perceived as inappropriate in many common communication situations. Jargon refers to language used by personnel in a particular field or to language used to represent specific terms within a field to those with a particular interest. Although jargon and slang can both be used to exclude non-group members from the conversation, slang tends to emphasize social and contextual understanding whereas the main purpose of jargon is to optimize communication using terms that imply technical understanding.

While colloquialisms and jargon may seem like slang because they reference a particular group, they do not necessarily fit the same definition because they do not represent a particular effort to replace the general lexicon of a standard language. Colloquialisms are considered more acceptable and more expected in standard usage than slang is, and jargon is often created to talk about aspects of a particular field that are not accounted for in the general lexicon. However, this differentiation is not consistently applied by linguists; the terms "slang" and "jargon" are sometimes treated as synonymous, and the scope of "jargon" is at times extended to mean all forms of socially-restricted language.

It is often difficult to differentiate slang from colloquialisms and even high-register lexicon, because slang terms that do not fall out of usage generally become accepted into common vocabulary over time. Words such as "spurious" and "strenuous" were once perceived as slang, but they are now considered general, even high-register words. Some literature on slang even says that mainstream acceptance of a slang term removes its status as true slang because it is then accepted by the media and is thus no longer the special insider speech of a particular group. For example, Black American music frequently uses AAVE slang, and many of its frequently used terms have subsequently been taken up by vernacular English in a broader context. Some say that slang is whatever would not be acceptable in academic or legal writing, but this fails to distinguish slang from language which is simply informal. Others say that a word is slang only until it has been entered in the Oxford English Dictionary, at which point its status changes.

=== Examples of slang (cross-linguistic) ===
- 1337 speak
- American slang (disambiguation page)
- Indonesian slang
- Argot
- British slang
- Bargoens
- Caló
- Cant
- Cantonese internet slang
- Cockney rhyming slang
- Fala dos arxinas
- Fenya
- Gayle language
- Generation Z and Alpha slang
- Jive talk
- IsiNgqumo
- Language game
- LGBTQ slang
- Lunfardo
- Internet meme
- Nadsat
- Polari
- Thieves' cant
- Verlan

== Formation of slang ==
It is often difficult to collect etymologies for slang terms, largely because slang is a phenomenon of speech, rather than written language and etymologies which are typically traced via corpus.

Eric Partridge, cited as the first to report on the phenomenon of slang in a systematic and linguistic way, postulated that a term would likely be in circulation for a decade before it would be written down. Nevertheless, it seems that slang generally forms via deviation from a standard form. This "spawning" of slang occurs in much the same way that any general semantic change might occur. The difference here is that the slang term's new meaning takes on a specific social significance having to do with the group the term indexes.

Coleman also suggests that slang is differentiated within more general semantic change in that it typically has to do with a certain degree of "playfulness". The development of slang is considered to be a largely "spontaneous, lively, and creative" speech process.

Still, while a great deal of slang takes off, even becoming accepted into the standard lexicon, much slang dies out, sometimes only referencing a group. An example of this is the term "groovy" which is a relic of 1960s and 70s American hippie slang. Nevertheless, for a slang term to become a slang term, people must use it, at some point in time, as a way to flout standard language. Additionally, slang terms may be borrowed between groups, such as the term "gig" which was originally coined by jazz musicians in the 1930s and then borrowed into the same hippie slang of the 1960s. 'The word "groovy" has remained a part of subculture lexicon since its popularization. It is still in common use today by a significant population. The word "gig" to refer to a performance very likely originated well before the 1930s, and remained a common term throughout the 1940s and 1950s before becoming vaguely associated with the hippie slang of the 1960s. The word "gig" is now a widely accepted synonym for a concert, recital, or performance of any type.

Generally, slang terms undergo the same processes of semantic change that words in the regular lexicon do.

Slang often forms from words with previously differing meanings, one example is the often used and popular slang word "lit", which was created by a generation labeled "Generation Z". The word itself used to be associated with something being on fire or being "lit" up until 1988 when it was first used in writing to indicate a person who was drunk in the book "Warbirds: Diary of an Unknown Aviator". Since this time "lit" has gained popularity through Rap songs such as ASAP Rocky's "Get Lit" in 2011. As the popularity of the word has increased so too has the number of different meanings associated with the word. Now "lit" describes a person who is drunk and/or high, as well as an event that is especially awesome and "hype".

Words and phrases from popular Hollywood films and television series frequently become slang.

== Early history ==
One early slang-like code, thieves' cant, was first used in England in around the year 1600 as a way of law-breakers to communicate without the authorities knowing of what they were saying.

== Social implications ==
=== Indexicality ===
Slang is usually associated with a particular social group and plays a role in constructing identity. While slang outlines social space, attitudes about slang partly construct group identity and identify individuals as members of groups. Therefore, using the slang of a particular group associates an individual with that group. Michael Silverstein's orders of indexicality can be employed to assign a slang term as a second-order index to that particular group. Using a slang term, however, can also give an individual the qualities associated with the term's group of origin, whether or not the individual is trying to identify as a member of the group. This allocation of qualities based on abstract group association is known as third-order indexicality.

As outlined in Elisa Mattiello's book "An Introduction to English Slang", a slang term can assume several levels of meaning and can be used for many reasons connected with identity. For example, male adolescents use the terms "foxy" and "shagadelic" to "show their belonging to a band, to stress their virility or their age, to reinforce connection with their peer group and to exclude outsiders, to show off, etc." These two examples use both traditional and nontraditional methods of word formation to create words with more meaning and expressiveness than the more direct and traditional words "sexy" and "beautiful":

- The slang term "foxy" is arguably not even a case of word formation since this process, (denominal adjective with -y suffix from "fox") already occurred in the formation of this word with its standard English meanings of "foxlike, crafty, cunning". Instead, the traditional word's meaning is extended to "attractive, desirable, pretty, sexy" with the following added implications according to Mattiello:

From the semantic point of view, slangy foxy is more loaded than neutral sexy in terms of information provided. That is, for young people foxy means having the quality of: (1) attracting interest, attention, affection, (2) causing desire, (3) excellent or admirable in appearance, and (4) sexually provocative, exciting, etc., whereas sexy only refers to the quality indicated in point (4).

- "shagadelic" is a combination of a slang term with a slang suffix and therefore is considered an "extra-grammatical" creation.

Matiello stresses that those agents who identify themselves as "young men" have "genuinely coined" these terms and choose to use them over "canonical" terms —like beautiful or sexy—because of the indexicalized social identifications the former convey.

==== First and second order indexicality ====
In terms of first and second order indexicality, the usage of speaker-oriented terms by male adolescents indicated their membership to their age group, to reinforce connection to their peer group, and to exclude outsiders.

==== Higher-order indexicality ====
In terms of higher order indexicality, anyone using these terms may desire to appear fresher, undoubtedly more playful, faddish, and colourful than someone who employs the standard English term "beautiful". This appearance relies heavily on the hearer's third-order understanding of the term's associated social nuances and presupposed use-cases.

=== Subculture associations ===
Often, distinct subcultures will create slang that members will use in order to associate themselves with the group, or to delineate outsiders.

Slang terms are often known only within a clique or ingroup. For example, Leet ("Leetspeak" or "1337") was originally popular only among certain internet subcultures such as software crackers and online video gamers. During the 1990s, and into the early 21st century, however, Leet became increasingly commonplace on the internet, and it has spread outside internet-based communication and into spoken languages. Other types of slang include SMS language used on mobile phones, and "chatspeak", (e.g., "LOL", an acronym meaning "laughing out loud" or "laugh out loud" or ROFL, "rolling on the floor laughing"), which are widely used in instant messaging on the internet.

As subcultures are often forms of counterculture, which is understood to oppose the norm, it follows that slang has come to be associated with counterculture.

=== Social media and internet slang ===
Slang is often adopted from social media as a sign of social awareness and shared knowledge of popular culture. This type known as internet slang has become prevalent since the early 2000s along with the rise in popularity of social networking services, including Facebook, Twitter, and Instagram. This has spawned new vocabularies associated with each new social media venue, such as the use of the term "friending" on Facebook, which is a verbification of "friend" used to describe the process of adding a new person to one's group of friends on the website, despite the existence of an analogous term "befriend". This term is much older than Facebook, but has only recently entered the popular lexicon. Other examples of slang in social media demonstrate a proclivity toward shortened words or acronyms. These are especially associated with services such as Twitter, which (as of November 2017) has a 280-character limit for each message and therefore requires a relatively brief mode of expression. This includes the use of hashtags which explicitly state the main content of a message or image, such as #food or #photography.

=== Debates about slang ===
Some critics believe that when slang becomes more commonplace it effectively eradicates the "proper" use of a certain language. However, academic (descriptive) linguists believe that language is not static but ever-changing and that slang terms are valid words within a language's lexicon. While prescriptivists study and promote the socially preferable or "correct" ways to speak, according to a language's normative grammar and syntactical words, descriptivists focus on studying language to further understand the subconscious rules of how individuals speak, which makes slang important in understanding such rules. Noam Chomsky, a founder of anthropological linguistic thought, challenged structural and prescriptive grammar and began to study sounds and morphemes functionally, as well as their changes within a language over time.

== In popular culture ==
The 1941 film Ball of Fire portrays a professor played by Gary Cooper who is researching and writing an encyclopedia article about slang.

The 2006 film Idiocracy portrays a less intelligent society in the year 2505 that has people who use all various sorts of aggressive slang. These slang phrases sound very foreign and alienating to the protagonist of the movie, a US Army librarian.

In the 2013 song "Fire", Big Sean says "Was in Japan so long, I almost learn to speak. Had to leave back to the hood, where they don't understand unless you speak in Trapanese." Not only was Sean trying to rhyme with the word “Japanese”, but he's jokingly combining it with the word "trap", slang for a house used to sell drugs or the hood in general. This humorous bar coins the term "trapanese" as another way to say "slang."

== See also ==
- A New Dictionary of the Terms Ancient and Modern of the Canting Crew
- Slang dictionary
- Language game
- Urban Dictionary
- Grammelot
- Gibberish
- Macaronic language
