= The Bashful Lover =

1636 English stage play

The Bashful Lover is a Caroline era stage play, a tragicomedy written by Philip Massinger. Dating from 1636, it is the playwright's last known extant work; it appeared four years before his death in 1640.

The play was licensed for performance by Sir Henry Herbert, the Master of the Revels, on 9 May 1636; it was acted by the King's Men at the Blackfriars Theatre. It was first published in 1655, in the octavo volume titled Three New Plays issued by Humphrey Moseley, a volume that also contained Massinger's The Guardian and the Massinger/Fletcher play A Very Woman. When Moseley entered the play into the Stationers' Register on 9 September 1653, he listed it as Alexius, the Chaste Gallant or The Bashful Lover. There is no character named "Alexius" in Massinger's play – but a play titled Alexius, the Chaste Gallant had been acted in 1639. This appears to have been an instance of Moseley's habit of taking advantage of the inherent confusion of titles and subtitles to register two plays for the price of one. (For similar examples, see The Guardian, The Lovers' Progress, and A Very Woman.)

Comic material from The Bashful Lover (and also from A Very Woman and The Guardian) was adapted into a droll titled Love Lost in the Dark in 1680. The Bashful Lover was successfully revived at Covent Garden in 1798.

No specific source for the play has been identified; but like many of Massinger's plays, The Bashful Lover shares linkages with the prose romances of contemporary Spanish writers like Miguel de Cervantes. Massinger's protagonist, Hortensio, has been characterized as "a sort of pale Quixote; a knight-errant a little cracked or crazed; very sincere, and a trifle given to uttering vague and useless professions of hyperbolic humility and devotion."

== Synopsis ==
The play is set in an ahistorical version of northern Italy during the High Renaissance. The Duke of Mantua, ruled by a Gonzaga, is threatened militarily by the ruler of Florence, Duke Lorenzo (suggesting one of the Medicis). The opening scene, however, deals with love rather than war: a love-sick gentleman who calls himself Hortensio is hanging around the Mantuan court, wherever he can catch sight of the princess Matilda. He is the "bashful lover" of the title. Hortensio has bribed Ascanio, the princess's page, to inform him of her movements – and Ascanio is open about this to his mistress, recognizing that Hortensio's infatuation is harmless. Matilda courteously meets with Hortensio, and allows his distant attentions.

But the Mantuan court is preoccupied with the military situation. The Duke receives the Florentine ambassador, Alonzo, but rejects Lorenzo's demands for the city's surrender and Matilda's hand in marriage. (When Ascanio sees Alonzo at court, he faints and is carried out.) The play's action swiftly moves to the Mantuan countryside; Hortensio has joined the Mantuan forces to prove his worth to Matilda, and Ascanio has accompanied him. When the two armies engage in combat, the Florentine forces are victorious.

In the process, the Florentine officer Alonzo is seriously wounded, and falls into the care of Octavio, a former Mantuan general and courtier who lives retired in the country after losing the Duke's favor. It turns out that the page Ascanio is Octavio's daughter Maria in disguise; she was previously seduced and abandoned by Alonzo. Octavio nurses Alonzo back to health; after his near death, Alonzo is reflective, and repentant over his treatment of Maria. (Octavio at one point masquerades as a monk to help Alonzo "cure the ulcers of his mind," to overcome his depression and mental distress – a feature typical of Massinger's dramaturgy.)

Hortensio, after fighting bravely and rescuing Gonzaga from capture, is himself captured by Lorenzo's forces – as is Matilda; the two are re-united in captivity. Duke Lorenzo, talking among his officers, admits that his prior demand for Matilda's hand was a feint of ambition, and that he has no real interest in her, or in a marriage of state. He changes his mind, however, when he actually meets her. The princess's beauty and her noble character work a change of heart upon Lorenzo: he renounces his military conquest and returns Mantua to Gonzaga's control. In his new magnanimity, Lorenzo allows Matilda a free choice among her three suitors – himself, Hortensio, and a prince of Parma named Uberti; but in eavesdropping on a conversation between Hortensio and Matilda, Lorenzo and Gonzaga come to recognize Hortensio as her worthiest choice. Uberti is less willing to concede—until it is revealed that Hortensio is actually Galeazzo, a prince of Milan and the new ruler of that city. Alonzo, recovered from his wounds, marries Maria, and Octavio is restored to favor.

== Sources ==
- Garrett, Martin. Massinger: The Critical Heritage. London, Routledge, 1991.
- Maxwell, Baldwin. Studies in Beaumont, Fletcher, and Massinger. Chapel Hill, NC, University of North Carolina Press, 1939.
- Phelan, James. On Philip Massinger. Halle, E. Karras, 1878.
- Symons, Arthur. Studies in the Elizabethan Drama. New York, E. P. Dutton, 1919.
