= Richard Phelps (artist) =

English painter (1710–1785)

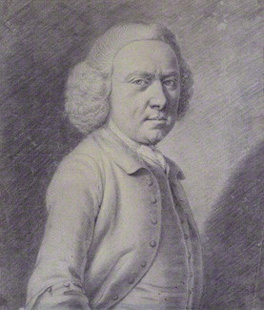
Richard Phelps, Self-portrait, 1771, charcoal, National Portrait Gallery, London

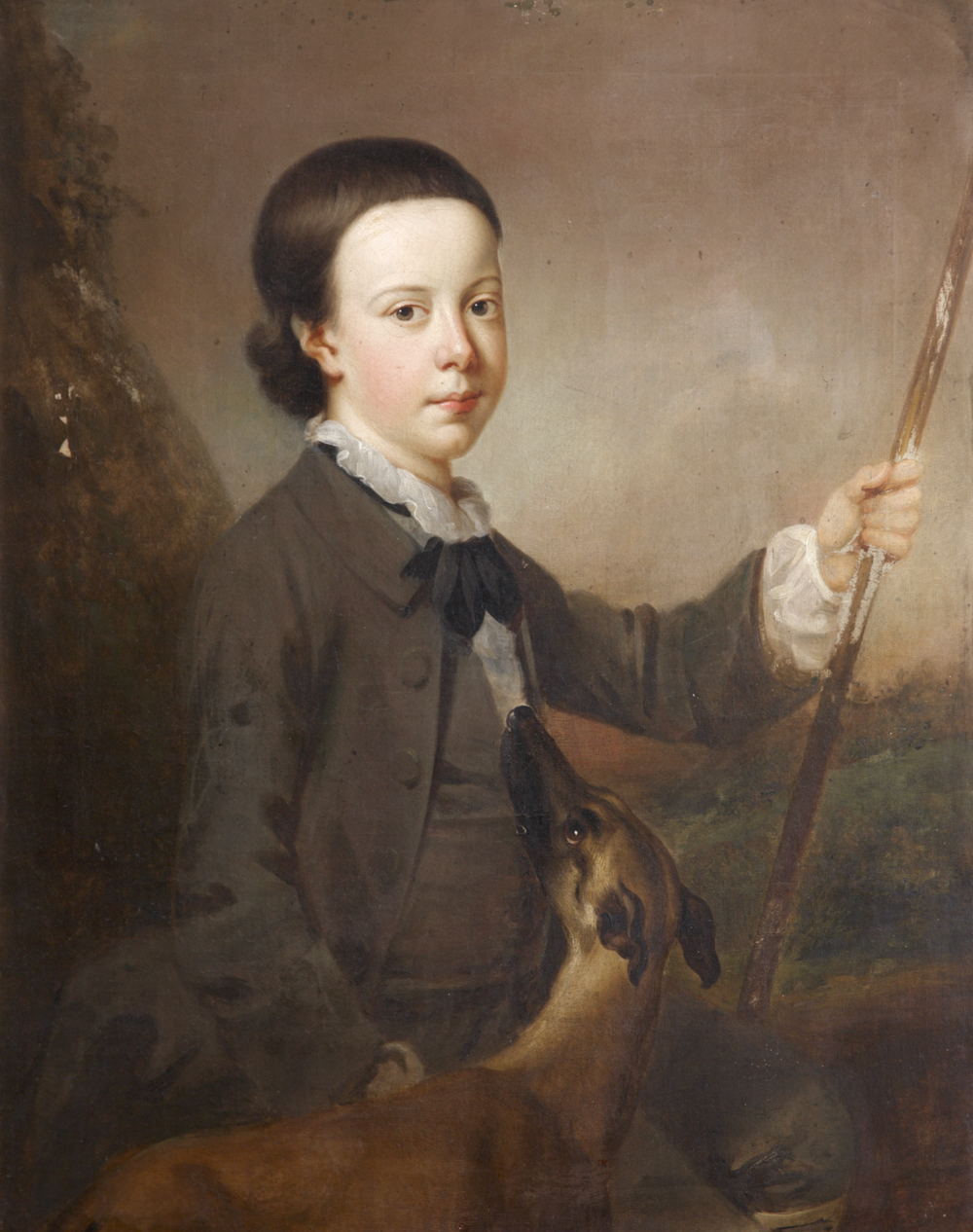
Sir Thomas Dyke Acland (1752–1794), 9th Baronet, as a Boy, c.1760, Killerton, National Trust

Richard Phelps (1710–1785) was an 18th-century English portrait painter and designer. He painted portraits of gentry, a number of which are in the National Trust, Dunster Castle, University of Oxford, National Portrait Gallery, London, and other museums. The British Museum has an album of 312 of his drawings. Phelps was also a landscape designer, who was hired by Henry Fownes Luttrell to update the grounds of Dunster Castle.

== Personal life ==
Richard Phelps was from Porlock and married to a woman named Mary. She died on 30 May 1753 and he died 12 July 1785. The couple and other family members are on a brass in Porlock Church. He had land holdings in Porlock, not far from his friend Coplestone Warre Bampfylde's estate, Hestercombe House.

The Phelps family appeared in Porlock during Elizabeth I's reign (1558-1603), such as yeoman Robert Phelps who had been in Porlock since about 1602. A Richard Phelps painted the Ten Commandments for the Luccombe Parish Church and the Lord's Prayer for the Porlock Church in 1738. (Note: There was an artist named John Phelps who made a drawing of The Manor Mill and Castle Inn of Porlock in the 19th century.)

== Career ==
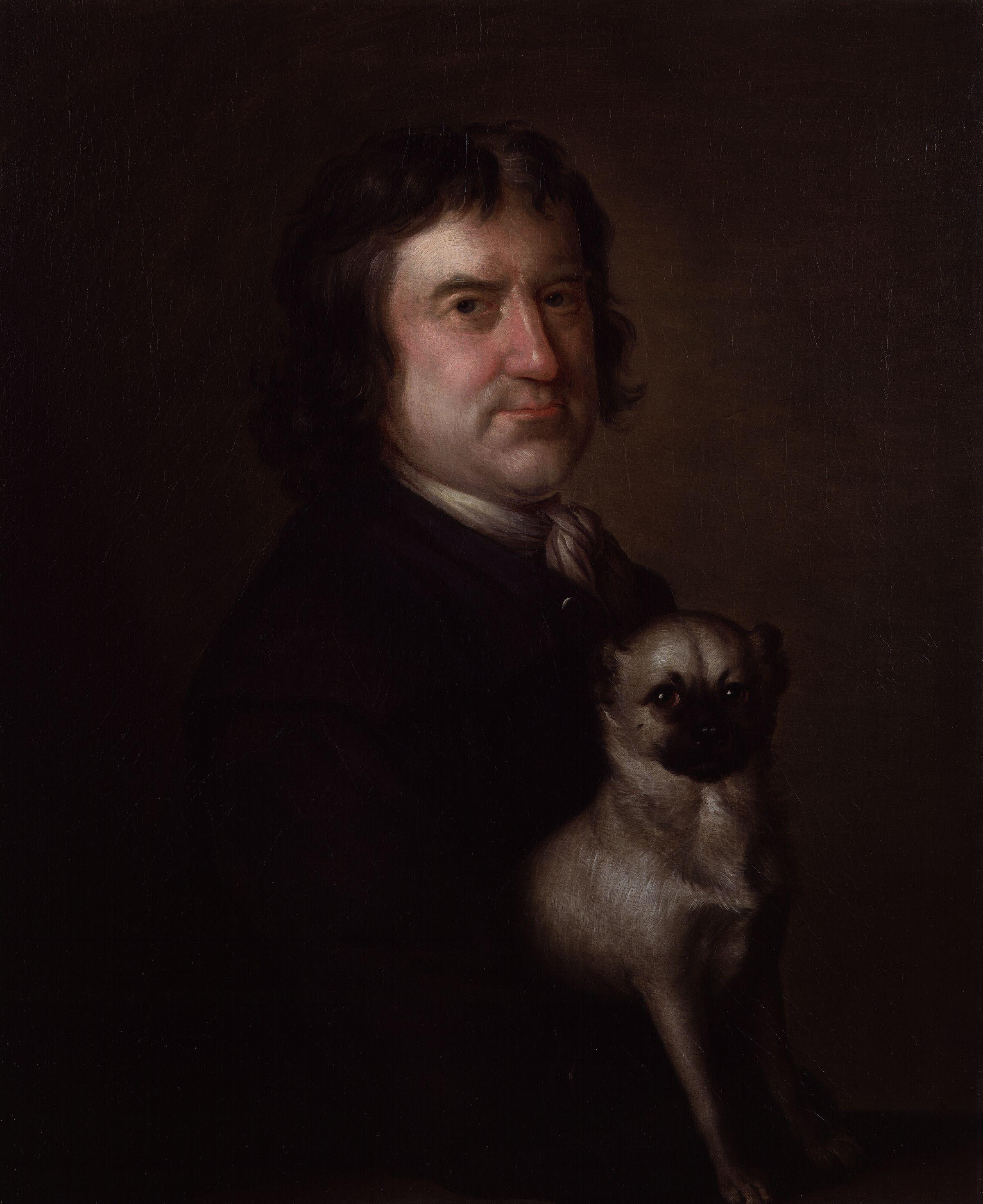
Bampfylde Moore Carew (1693-1759), 1750, National Portrait Gallery, London

Phelps was a portrait painter. He studied under Thomas Hudson and Sir Joshua Reynolds. Phelps worked in Somerset painting portraits, restoring old master paintings, and working as an interior decorator. Correspondence by Richard Phelps is held at Penn Libraries of the University of Pennsylvania in the United States.

=== Artist ===
Richard Phelps is known for his painting of Bampfylde Moore Carew, which was engraved by Faber. He may have made the pastel work of George Frideric Handel that was exhibited in Paris in 1911. Phelps exhibited in London at The Society of Artists. Phelps was described as a "provincial Highmore" by Sir Ellis Waterhouse.

The British Museum has an album of the bulk of his surviving work, which includes 312 drawings. The works include portraits of gentry, self-portraits, landscapes, genre paintings, religious studies, and grotesque figures. His drawings include George, Thomas, Mrs. Mary Carew, and Elizabeth Carew Bernard. He drew sketches of John, Thomas Popham, and Miss Popham. Some of the other people that he depicted include the Dyke Acland family members; Charles Jennens; Margaret Luttrell (wife of Alexander Luttrell); Rev. Henry Lockett; Henry Percy, 9th Earl of Northumberland; Prince Charles Edward Louis Philip Casimir, and Sir Charles Tynte, 5th Baronet. Some of the drawings are made after the works of other artists, like Rembrandt, Thomas Hudson, Joseph van Haecken. The album also included works by Alessio de Marchis and an 18th-century Bolognese artist. It previously held two works by John Vanderbank. Dovery Manor Museum exhibited paintings by Richard Phelps in 2011.

=== Designer ===
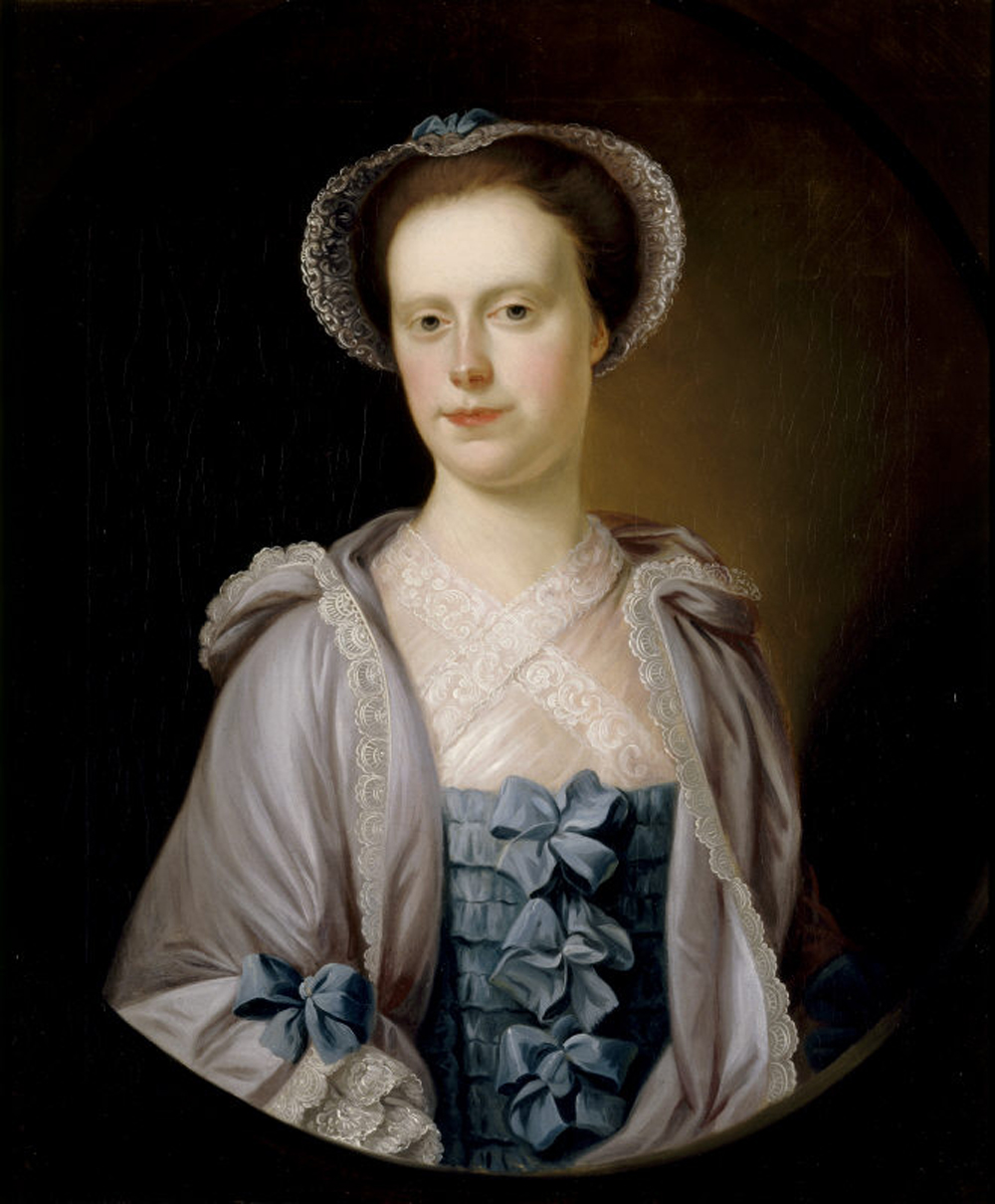
Margaret Fownes-Luttrell (1726-1766), Dunster Castle, National Trust

Phelps was hired by Henry Fownes Luttrell to design Conygar Tower, landscaping, and bridges for Dunster Castle. Conygar Tower is a three-storey folly built in 1775 on the top of a wooded hill overlooking the village of Dunster. It has two-stage buttresses between four pointed-arched openings on every level. He designed the 18th century Castle Mill Bridge over River Avill, which connected Dunster Castle grounds with Deer Park. The stone bridge, with two pointed arches with rock-faced voussoirs, replaced a medieval mill bridge. It was made of local stone, brick capping, and pebbles and designed with a rustic, picturesque style. There are brick parapets on the north and south side of the bridge, with a brick seat. It was listed as an English Heritage Listed Building (264701) on 8 April 1983.

== Collections ==
- The Burrell Collection, Glasgow Museums & Art Galleries
  - Elizabeth Prowse, c.1769, oil on canvas (Note: Attributed to Richard Phelps.)
- Bristol City Museum and Art Gallery
  - Eleanor, Walter and Jane Burton, The Georgian House Museum
  - Thomas Goldney III, 1751
- National Portrait Gallery, London
  - Bampfylde Moore Carew, 1750
- National Trust, Dunster Castle
  - Margaret Trevelyan (1704–1764), Mrs Alexander Luttrell, Later Mrs Edward Dyke
  - Margaret Luttrell (1726–1766), Mrs Henry Fownes Luttrell, oil on canvas
  - Margaret Luttrell (1726–1766), Mrs Henry Fownes Luttrell, oil on canvas
  - Margaret Luttrell (1747–1792), Mrs John Henry Southcote, as a Child, oil on canvas
- National Trust, Killerton
  - Sir Thomas Dyke Acland (1752–1794), 9th Baronet, as a Boy, c.1760, oil on canvas
- Somerset Museums Service
  - Edward Ellis as a Child, oil on canvas
  - Hannah Ellis, Mrs Joseph Metford (1722–1798), oil on canvas
  - Portrait of an Unknown Gentleman, 1751
- University of Oxford
  - Peregrine Palmer (1703/1704–1762), DCL, 1764, oil on canvas, Examination Schools
