= A New Dictionary of the Terms Ancient and Modern of the Canting Crew =

English slang dictionary, c. 1698

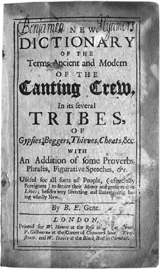
- Author: B. E.
- Language: English
- Subject: Cant and slang
- Genre: Dictionary
- Publisher: W. Hawes
- Publication date: Circa 1698
- Publication place: England

A New Dictionary of the Terms Ancient and Modern of the Canting Crew is a dictionary of English cant and slang by a compiler known only by the initials B. E., first published in London c. 1698. With over 4,000 entries, it was the most extensive dictionary of non-standard English in its time, until it was superseded in 1785 by Francis Grose's Classical Dictionary of the Vulgar Tongue. B. E.'s New Dictionary was used as a source by many subsequent dictionaries.

== Full title ==
Its full title is A New Dictionary of the Terms Ancient and Modern of the Canting Crew, in Its Several Tribes, of Gypsies, Beggers, Thieves, Cheats, &c. with an Addition of Some Proverbs, Phrases, Figurative Speeches, &c.

== See also ==
- Cant (language)
