= Xavier Petulengro =

British Romanichal horse trader and violinist (1878–1957)

- Born: 8 July 1878; Rochdale, England
- Died: 16 June 1957 (aged 78); Littlehampton, England
- Other names: Gipsy Petulengro; Walter Lloyd; Walter Smith
- Occupations: writer, broadcaster

Xavier Petulengro (8 July 1878 – 16 June 1957), more often known as Gipsy Petulengro, was a British Romanichal horse trader, violinist, businessman, writer and broadcaster, known as the "King of the Gypsies". He frequently broadcast on BBC radio in the 1930s and 1940s, and later wrote regular astrology columns in magazines as well as publishing his autobiography and several books on Romani lore.

== Life ==
Details of his birth and childhood are uncertain. Sources suggest that he was born in Rochdale, Lancashire, to a Romani family, and probably lived for part of his childhood near Galaţi in Romania, where his father traded Welsh ponies. He also used the family names Walter Lloyd and Walter Smith. According to his own autobiography, he was the grandson of Ambrose Smith (c.1804-1878), known as Jasper Petulengro, the semi-fictionalised subject of the books Lavengro and Romany Rye by George Borrow. In order to support this connection he antedated his birth to 1859. The name 'Petulengro', comes from the Sanskrit 'Petul' meaning horseshoe and 'Engro' from the Romani meaning man or thing, hence 'Blacksmith'.

Unusually among Gypsies at the time, he learned to read and write, later claiming that this was due to the assistance of Admiral Arthur Wilson VC of the Royal Navy and his sister, but also with the help of a farmer's wife, Martha Clark, in Whitehaven, Cumberland, where the family spent several winters. As a young man he followed his father into the horse-trading business, and also served in the British army, allegedly signing up after getting involved in a fight with a gamekeeper.

In the 1920s, when living in Manchester, he was invited to help re-establish a tradition of Gypsy "parties" at Baildon in Yorkshire, which had taken place in the area for several centuries but which had died out after 1897. In 1929 the annual parties were revived, with 'real' Gypsies attending alongside local people dressed up in costume.

In the 1930s, he was regularly featured on BBC Radio's popular programme In Town Tonight, becoming known as "the famous broadcasting Gypsy". He also began writing articles on Gypsy lore and food for The Listener. In 1935 he published his first book, Romany Remedies and Recipes, followed in 1937 by an autobiography, A Romany Life. Both were published under the name Gipsy (sic) Petulengro. He also established a mail order business, Petulengro's Herbal Products in 1938 and this business was carried on by his grandson 'Paul Petulengro' until 1991.

He was described as the "King of the Gypsies" in an account of a Romani wedding at Baildon in 1937 between his son Leon Petulengro and Illeana Smith. According to press reports at the time, Xavier Petulengro cut the hands of the couple to mingle their blood, and bound their wrists with a silk cord, as part of the ceremony. The wedding was covered by several newspapers and filmed by Pathé News for showing in cinemas. As "King of the Gypsies" he officiated at other traditional weddings.

After the Second World War he went on to write an astrology column, "Your Fate in the Stars", in the Sunday Chronicle national newspaper. He died in Littlehampton, Sussex, on 16 June 1957, aged about 78. His funeral was held at Viney Hill, near Lydney in the Forest of Dean, Gloucestershire, which he had visited many times and where he had said he wished to be buried. The funeral was arranged in traditional Romanichal style, with about 100 mourners in traditional costumes and some 1,500 sightseers.

== Heritage ==
After his death, Xavier Petulengro's business interests were continued by Leon Petulengro, who also became well known as a writer of popular astrology columns.

== Bibliography ==
- Romany Remedies and Recipes (1935)
- Britain Through Gypsy Eyes (1937)
- A Romany Life (1937)
- Book of Mystery (1937)
- Romany Love (1938)
- Fanya (1938)
