= A Very Woman =

Play by Philip Massinger and John Fletcher

A Very Woman, or The Prince of Tarent is an early seventeenth-century stage play, a tragicomedy written by Philip Massinger and John Fletcher. It was first published in 1655, fifteen and thirty years after the deaths of its authors.

== Date ==
Scholars generally agree that the existing text of the play is a Massinger revision of an earlier work, though they disagree as to whether that earlier version was a Fletcher/Massinger collaboration or a work by Fletcher alone. (Cyrus Hoy favoured the latter view.) So the original must have predated Fletcher's death in 1625; lacking hard data on this point, scholars have estimated a date of authorship in the 1619–22 period. The play entered the historical record when it was licensed for performance by Sir Henry Herbert, the Master of the Revels, on 6 June 1634; it is not improbable that Massinger's revision of the text shortly preceded that licensing. No firm information on the play's early stage history has survived; it is more likely than not that the play was acted by the King's Men, the company that performed most of the solo works of Fletcher and Massinger and their collaborations as well.

Early in the Restoration era, A Very Woman received a revival production in Oxford (1661).

== Publication ==
A Very Woman first appeared in print when it was included in an octavo volume titled Three New Plays, issued by Humphrey Moseley in 1655; the volume also contained Massinger's plays The Guardian and The Bashful Lover. (This 1655 volume appears to unite the final three surviving works of Massinger's dramatic career.) When Moseley entered the play into the Stationers' Register on 9 September 1653, he gave it a different subtitle, calling it A Very Woman, or The Woman's Plot. This alternative subtitle is found nowhere else, and there is no "woman's plot" in the play; but a play with the title The Woman's Plot was acted at Court on 5 November 1621. Moseley employed the possibilities for confusion inherent in play titles and subtitles to register two plays for a single fee – which appears to be what he did in this case. (For other examples of Moseley's trick, see The Bashful Lover, The Guardian, and The Lovers' Progress.)

== Authorship ==
The original edition attributed the play to Massinger alone. Nineteenth-century scholars devoted much attention to the study of the canon of Fletcher and his collaborators, including the plays of Fletcher and Massinger. In the context of that general study, A Very Woman attracted attention; F. G. Fleay was the first commentator to recognise Fletcher's presence. Given Fletcher's highly distinctive textual and stylistic preferences, scholars have found it easy to distinguish between the two authors in the extant text. Their respective shares break down this way:

Massinger — Act I; Act II, scenes 1, 2, and 3a (to Duke's exit); Act IV, 2; Act V;
Fletcher — Act II, scene 3b (from Duke's exit); Act III; Act IV, 1 and 3.

Massinger's friend Sir Aston Cockayne borrowed heavily from A Very Woman for his own play The Obstinate Lady (published 1658).

The uncertainties of the play's origin led early critics astray in one particular. The name of the character Cardenes led some to wonder if A Very Woman had some connection with the lost play Cardenio, attributed to Fletcher and Shakespeare. Modern critics dismiss any connection between the two.

Speculation has also linked A Very Woman with the lost play The Spanish Viceroy.

== Sources ==
The dramatists' primary source for their story was El amante liberal (1613) by Miguel de Cervantes; Massinger's revision was influenced by Burton's The Anatomy of Melancholy. The work was also influenced by The Mirror of Knighthood.

== Synopsis ==
The play is set in Palermo in Sicily, in Massinger's era – during the Spanish Habsburg rule of southern Italy. The plot involves the intertwined marital fortunes of the younger generation of two prominent families – those of the (otherwise unnamed) Viceroy of Sicily and Duke of Messina. The Viceroy has a son, Don Pedro, and a daughter, Almira; the Duke has a son, Don Martino Cardenes, and a niece, Leonora. The two couples, Pedro and Leonora and Cardenes and Almira, are in love and hope to be married.

One source of contention clouds their matchmaking: another wealthy and prominent nobleman and a close friend of Pedro's, Don John Antonio, the Prince of Tarent (or Taranto, in southern Italy), had come to the Viceroy's court in Palermo with great display and expense, hoping to win the hand of Almira. She, however, has refused his suit in favour of Cardenes, and none too subtly or gently. As the play opens, Antonio has asked permission to pay his farewell respects to Almira; but in her arrogance she refuses this last courtesy. Pedro protests her rudeness, but Cardenes, an insecure and touchy young man, supports her decision. He goes a step further, confronting the departing Antonio, picking a quarrel with him, and striking him. The two draw their swords, and Antonio inflicts a severe and almost fatal wound upon Cardenes.

Antonio is arrested and confined to prison – but his friend Pedro helps him escape. Cardenes survives his wound but endures a long convalescence and a bout of deep depression; Almira, burdened with grief and guilt, is sometimes hysterical, and those around her fear that she is losing her sanity. The Duke of Messina is incensed that Antonio has escaped the Viceroy's authority, and suspects collusion, though Pedro denies it. The Duke has Leonora accompany Almira in her convalescent seclusion, to keep her away from Pedro; both women are put under the watch of a court functionary named Cuculo and his wife Borachia.

Antonio returns to Palermo, but appears in the slave market in the guise of a Turk; he is purchased by Cuculo and becomes a household servant, where he impresses everyone with his manners and breeding. Borachia thinks he must be the son of the Turkish sultan. In his slave guise, Antonio acts as the go-between for Pedro and Leonora. Both Cardenes and Almira are enduring their own versions of recovery from mental stress; Cardenes is under the cure of a prominent physician, while Leonora helps Almira regain her emotional balance. Almira loses some of her arrogance and acquires a measure of humility and sense; she also develops an infatuation with the Turkish slave who is really Antonio, her spurned suitor.

When pirates break into Cuculo's house and attempt to abduct Almira and Leonora, Antonio plays a crucial role in fighting off the would-be kidnappers and rescue the two women. But while their fathers are expressing their gratitude, Almira provokes her father by announcing that she is in love with the Turkish slave. The irate Viceroy sends the man to prison, but Almira refuses to back down, saying that she will inflict upon herself whatever torture he suffers. The matter is resolved once Antonio reveals his true identity. Cardenes is now fully cured, restored to physical and mental health – but the court is astonished when Cardenes rejects the idea of marrying Almira. His near-fatal wound, his long convalescence, and his depression have given the young man a more mature and austere view of life, and he has turned away from egotism and sensuality. With Antonio substituted for Cardenes, the two couples who began the play can proceed to the altar.

The comic relief in the play involves subjects – alcoholism and slavery — that are now generally considered questionable sources of humour. Borachia is an alcoholic, who turns aggressive and caustic when drunk; one of the slaves is an Englishman who has lived in France and absorbed French manners, a source of amusement for the play's original audience. On the more serious side, the drama displays Massinger's strong interest in medical and psychiatric matters and especially in the subject of clinical depression and its treatment.

Samuel Taylor Coleridge reportedly once called the piece "one of the most perfect plays we have" — an extreme of enthusiasm that no other commentator has matched.
