= Rogue literature =

Literary genre

Rogue literature is a literary genre that tells stories from the world of thieves and other criminals that was popular in England in the 16th and 17th centuries. The stories were mostly in a confessional form and full of vivid descriptions. Rogue literature is an important source in understanding the everyday life of the ordinary people and their language, and the language of thieves and beggars. This genre can be related to the stories of Robin Hood and jest book literature, as well as early examples of the first voice in fiction and autobiography.

The principal authors of such stories were Thomas Harman, Robert Copland, Robert Greene and Thomas Dekker.
