= Sarah Griffin =

English printer, 17th century

Sarah Griffin was a professional printer who worked in London in the seventeenth century. She ran her own business from 1652 when she inherited the printing house of her deceased husband, Edward. By 1668 she was operating two presses and employed one apprentice and six workmen. Her varied output included multiple editions of Rose's Almanac for the Stationers' Company along with works in Latin and French. Along with her son Bennett-John she printed the first published work by the poet Thomas Traherne, a work of Church history called Roman Forgeries (1673).
