= Gilderoy Scamp =

Romani boxer (1812–1893)

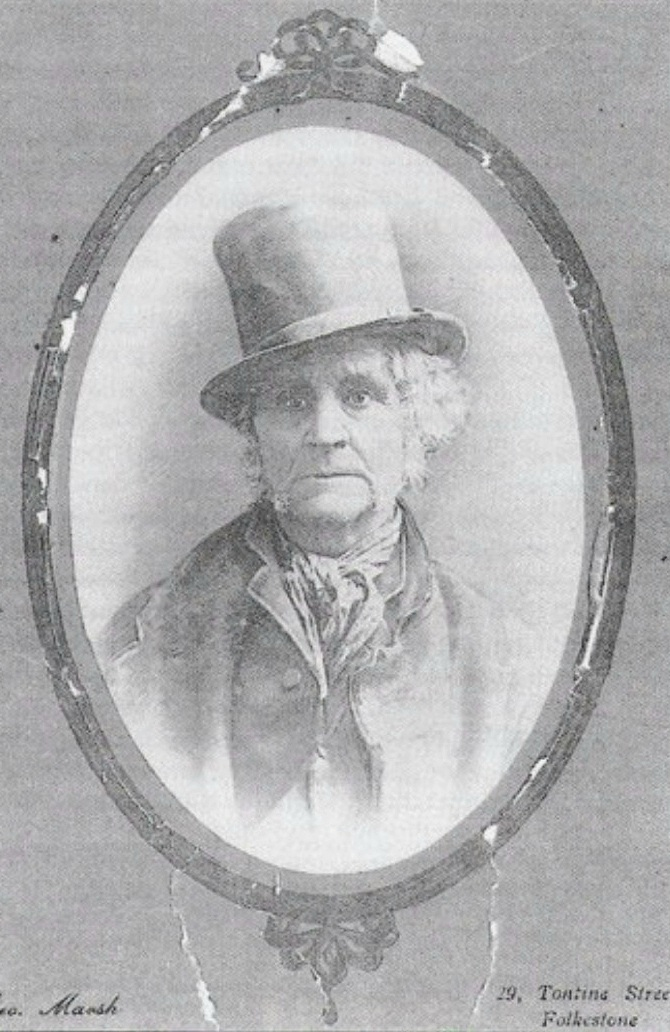
- Scamp wearing his hat gifted from Mayer Rothschild

Personal information
- Nicknames: King of the Gypsies, King Scamp, King of the Roma
- Born: Gilderoy Scamp; 7 June 1812 Orpington, Kent, England
- Died: 12 June 1893 (aged 81) Elham, Kent
- Occupation: Boxer

Boxing career

Gilderoy Scamp (7 June 1812 – 12 June 1893) was a bare-knuckle boxer called "King of the Gypsies". He succeeded his father upon his abdication in the early 1840s.
