= Bampfylde Moore Carew =

English imposter (1690–1758)

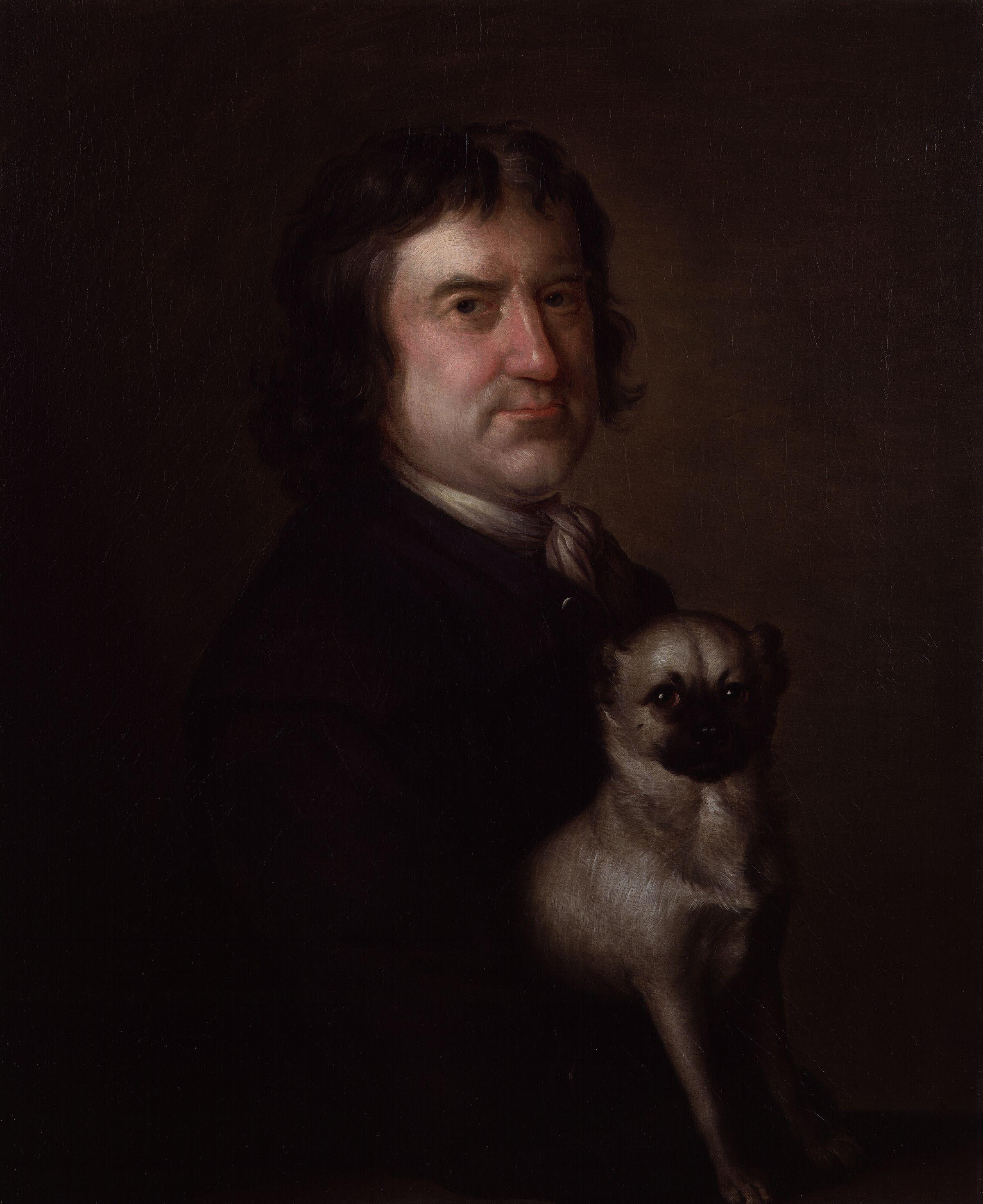
- 1750 portrait of Carew by Richard Phelps
- Born: Bickleigh, Mid Devon, England
- Baptised: 23 September 1690
- Died: 1758 (aged 67–68); Bickleigh, Mid Devon, England
- Occupation: Rogue

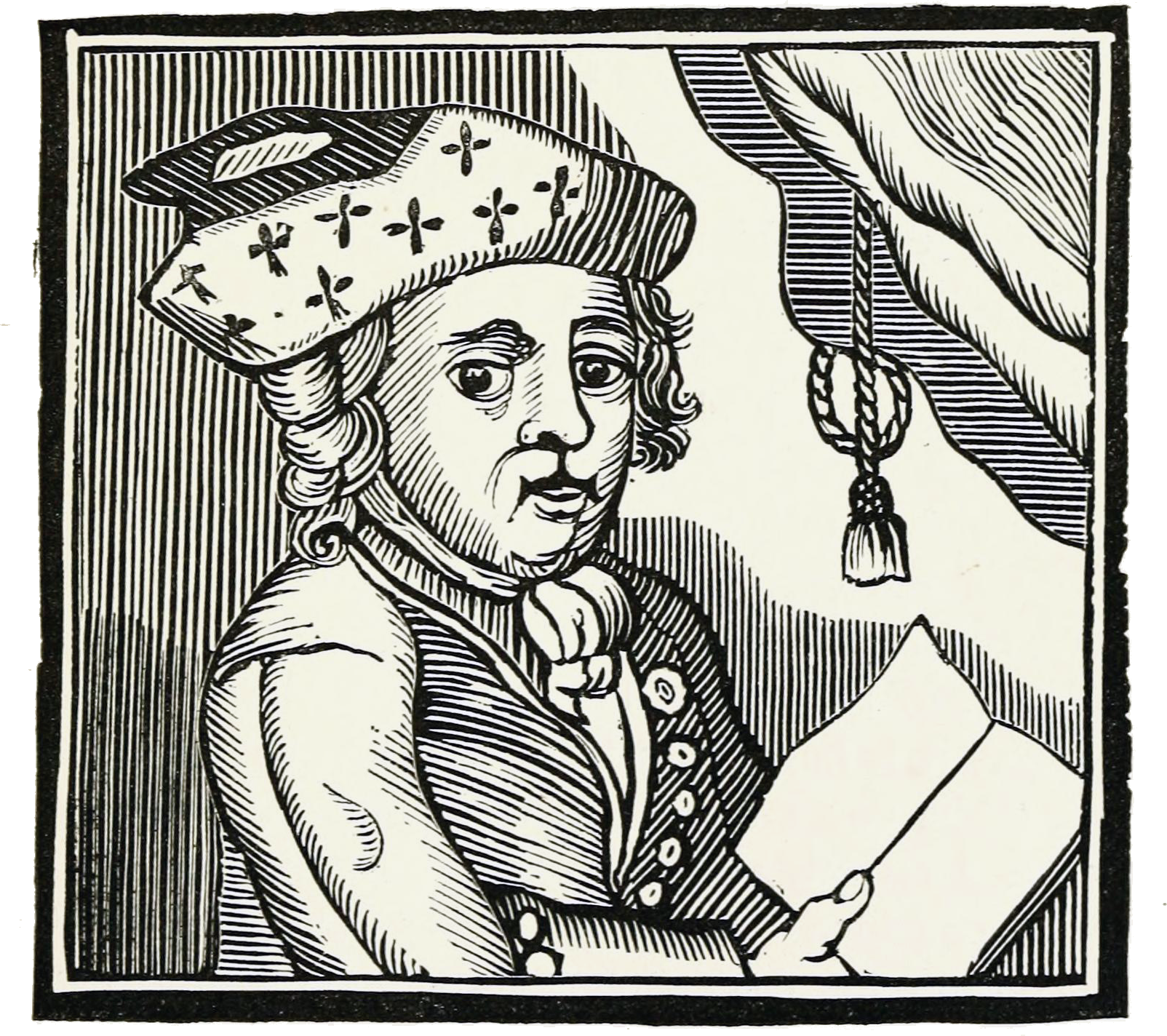
Illustration of an 18th-century chapbook.

Bampfylde Moore Carew /ˈbæmˌfiːld, kəˈruː/ was an English rogue, vagabond and impostor who claimed to be King of the Beggars.

== Life ==
Baptized at Bickleigh, Devon, on 23 September 1690, Bampfylde Moore Carew was the son of Reverend Theodore Carew, rector of Bickleigh. The Carews were a well-established Devonshire family. Although they had a reputation for adventurousness, Bampfylde Moore Carew took this to extremes, if his picaresque memoirs are to be believed. Little is known about his life beyond these, in which he is described on the title-page as "the Noted Devonshire Stroller and Dogstealer".

== The Life and Adventures of Bampfylde Moore Carew ==
=== Literary history ===
The Life and Adventures of Bampfylde Moore Carew was first published in 1745. Although it states that the contents were "noted by himself during his passage to America" and it is likely that facts were supplied by Carew, the author was probably Robert Goadby, a printer in Sherborne, Dorset, who published an early edition in 1749. It has been suggested that Carew dictated his memoirs to Mrs Goadby.

The Life continued to be a best seller throughout the next hundred years in numerous editions as books and chapbooks. He became a nationally known character, appealing to a provincial audience. One edition of the Life was printed in Hull in 1785.

How much of the Life is true is impossible now to know. Carew certainly travelled and is likely to have indulged in minor crimes, but many stories seem too fantastic or literary to be true. It appealed to the market for mild 'rogue' literature and many editions included a canting dictionary. The public found the Life appealing: an educated man from a good family who spent his life ingeniously and audaciously outwitting the establishment, including people who should have recognised him, and without ever doing anything really bad.

Carew seemingly settled in Bickleigh towards the end of his life. This may have been because of an offer of support from his relative, Sir Thomas Carew of Bickerton, winning a lottery, or simply age and weariness. Some editions of the Life suggest that Carew reflected with sadness on how 'idly' he had spent his life—perhaps making a racy story more acceptable by adding a moral ending.

Carew died at Bickleigh in 1758 (buried 28 June), leaving a daughter.

=== Contents ===
Carew claims to have taken to the road after he ran away from Blundell's School in Tiverton. With friends, he chased a deer through fields causing damage, which caused farmers to complain to the headmaster. Carew ran away and, at an alehouse, fell in with a band of “gypsies”. (These were almost certainly not Romany but vagabonds living off their wits.) Carew travelled widely, at first around Devon and then around England, supporting himself by playing confidence tricks on the wealthy.

His first trick involved a “Madam Musgrove”, who asked for his help in discovering treasure she believed was hidden on her land. Carew, consulting “the secrets of his arts” for a fee of 20 guineas, informed her it was under a laurel tree but that she should not seek it until a particular day and hour. Of course, by the appointed time Carew and her money were long gone. This was a well-known and documented trick from a period when cunning folk were often consulted about lost items.

Carew claimed to be a master of disguise, in which he followed the tradition of counterfeit rogues dating back to Thomas Harman. He masqueraded as a shipwrecked sailor (a popular way to claim alms), a clergyman, and defrauding “Squire Portman” twice in one day, first as a rat-catcher and then a woman whose daughter had been killed in a fire (another staple of fraudulent beggars).

Carew then travelled to Newfoundland, where he stayed a short time. On his return, he pretended to be the mate of a vessel and eloped with the daughter of a respectable apothecary of Newcastle upon Tyne, whom he afterwards married. After further years as a vagabond, he claimed to have been elected King of the Gypsies upon the death of Clause Patch. The ceremony described reproduces one from Thomas Harman’s Caveat for Common Cursitors, via the popular play Beggars' Bush by Francis Beaumont, John Fletcher, and Philip Massinger in which Clause is a character.

On 5 May 1739, Carew (described as ‘the noted Dog-stealer’ who upon his arraignment ‘behaved to the Justices in a most insulting manner’) was convicted of being an idle vagrant and sentenced to be transported to Maryland. There he attempted to escape, was captured, escaped again, and fell in with friendly Indians. He travelled to Pennsylvania, swam the Delaware, adopted the guise of a Quaker, and made his way to Philadelphia and New York City.

Having embarked for England, he escaped being pressed to serve in the Navy by pricking his hands and face, and rubbing in bay salt and gunpowder, so as to simulate smallpox (such tricks were commonplaces in rogue literature). On returning to England, he claims, he found his wife and daughter and then travelled to Scotland by 1745 in time to accompany Bonnie Prince Charlie to Carlisle and Derby.

An interesting aside is that when he was sentenced to be transported to Maryland it was in the ships of a company run by a family of Bideford Port, Devon, which later married into the Moore, Bampfylde, and Carew families.

There is a Bond and a Contract from Mr Davy, Clerk of the Peace and Justices, for the transport of Richard Bond, Bampfield Moore Carew, William Crocker, Abraham Hart, Edward Browne, John Smith, Judith Daw and Mary Underhill to Virginia. Bampfield Moore Carew's name is inserted in the Bond only. The trade of transporting convicts was common from the West Country ports in the 18th century as a return cargo for the tobacco trades, Bideford being one of the major centres for such imports.

== Sources ==
- The life and adventures of Bamfylde Moore Carew, the noted Devonshire stroller and dogstealer (1745)
- An apology for the life of Bampfylde-Moore Carew (son of the Rev. Mr. Carew, of Bickley) (1749?)
- Nooney, M.A., The cant dictionary of Bampfylde-Moore Carew: a study of the contents and changes in various editions (1969)
- King of the Beggars BBC
- Musa Pedestris - Three Centuries of Canting Songs
- Bickleigh, Devon, England Parish register, baptism of Bampfylde-Moore, son of Theodore Carew, on 23 September 1690
- Stoke Damerel, Devon, England Parish Register, marriage of Bampfylde-Moore Carew and Mary Gray on 29 December 1733
- Bickleigh, Devon, England Parish register, burial of Bampfylde-Moore Carew on 28 June 1758 in St. Mary the Virgin Churchyard
