= Beggars' Bush =

English play

- Characters: Woolfort; Gerrard; Jaculin
- Original language: English
- Genre: Tragicomedy
- Setting: England

Premiere
- Date premiered: 17th century
- Place premiered: England

Beggars' Bush is a Jacobean era stage play, a comedy in the canon of John Fletcher and his collaborators that is a focus of dispute among scholars and critics.

== Authorship ==
The authorship and the date of the play have long been debated by commentators. Critics generally agree that the hands of Fletcher and Philip Massinger are manifest in the text, but they dispute the presence of Francis Beaumont. Cyrus Hoy, in his wide-ranging survey of authorship problems in Fletcher's canon, judged all three dramatists to have contributed to the play, and produced this breakdown among them:

Beaumont – Act II; Act V, scenes 1 and 2b (from Hubert's entrance to end);
Fletcher – Acts III and IV;
Massinger – Act I; Act V, scene 2a (to Hubert's entrance).

Yet John H. Dorenkamp, in his 1967 edition of the play, rejects Beaumont's presence and attributes Acts I, II, and V to Massinger. (Dorenkamp agrees with Hoy and earlier critics in assigning Acts III and IV to Fletcher; Fletcher's distinctive pattern of stylistic and textual preferences makes his contribution easy to recognize.)

The question of Beaumont's possible authorial contribution complicates the question of the play's date. Beggars' Bush enters the historical record when it was performed for the Court at Whitehall Palace by the King's Men in the Christmas season of 1622 (on the evening of 27 December, "St. John's Day at night"). Some commentators argue that the play was probably new and current in that year, and was likely written shortly before – which would eliminate Beaumont, who had died in 1616. Scholars who favour Beaumont's presence must date the play prior to 1616, though evidence for such an early date is lacking.

The picture is also clouded by the question of the nature of Massinger's contribution; some critics have seen him as a direct collaborator with Fletcher, others merely as the reviser of an earlier Beaumont and Fletcher play. The text does show some of the discontinuities that can frequently be found in revised plays. (In the opening scene, for example, the usurper Woolfort calls Florez by his pseudonym Goswin, something he should not know.)

== Publication ==
Beggars' Bush received its initial publication in the first Beaumont and Fletcher folio of 1647. The play was published in an individual quarto edition by Humphrey Robinson and Anne Moseley in 1661; the play was included in the second Beaumont and Fletcher folio of 1679 and subsequent editions of their works. It also exists in a 17th-century manuscript in the Lambarde MS. collection (Folger Shakespeare Library, MS. 1487.2), in the hand of Edward Knight, the "book-keeper" or prompter of the King's Men.

== After 1642 ==
After the closure of the London theatres in 1642, at the start of the English Civil War, a droll known as The Lame Commonwealth was formed from material extracted from Beggars' Bush. The droll features additional dialogue strongly suggesting it was taken from a performance text. The Lame Commonwealth was printed in Francis Kirkman's The Wits, or Sport Upon Sport (1662), a collection of twenty-seven drolls.

Beggars' Bush was revived and adapted during the Restoration era. Samuel Pepys saw an early production at Gibbon's Tennis Court on 20 November 1660. In a 3 January 1661 performance of the play, Pepys, for the first time in his life, saw women appear onstage. One popular adaptation titled The Royal Merchant was published, probably in 1706 (the quarto is undated). This was later adapted by Thomas Hull into an opera, which was published in 1768. Another adaptation called The Merchant of Bruges, by Douglas Kinnaird, was printed in 1816, 1824, and 1834. And John Dryden modeled the main plot of his Marriage à la mode (1672) on Beggars' Bush.

== Plot ==
The play is one of several works of English Renaissance drama that present a lighthearted, romanticized, Robin-Hood-like view of the world of beggars, thieves, and gypsies; in this respect it can be classed with plays of its own era like The Spanish Gypsy, Massinger's The Guardian, Suckling's The Goblins, and Brome's A Jovial Crew, as well as a group of earlier works, like the Robin Hood plays of Anthony Munday.

Although the timeframe is inconsistent, Beggars' Bush is set seven years after a fictional war between Flanders and Brabant. The victorious Flemish general Woolfort has usurped the throne of Flanders. The rightful royal family, including Gerrard and his daughter Jaculin, have fled, their current whereabouts unknown. Gerrard has adopted a masquerade as Claus, who is elected king of the beggars. Other characters also maintain disguises and have hidden identities, including the missing daughter of the Duke of Brabant. The play's plot shows the working-out of these complexities and the restoration of the rightful rulers; true lovers are also re-united. Yet the play also contains serious aspects that have caused it to be classified as a tragicomedy by some commentators; "Through mixed modes Beggars Bush exhibits serious sociopolitical concerns to earn a classification that at first seems incongruous – a political tragicomedy."

(The character of Clause, the King of the Beggars, also appears as a character in later works, such as the memoirs of Bampfylde Moore Carew, the self-proclaimed King of the Beggars.)

== Sources ==
- Clark, Ira. The Moral Art of Philip Massinger. Lewisburg, PA, Bucknell University Press, 1993.
- Leech, Clifford. The John Fletcher Plays. London, Chatto & Windus, 1962.
- Logan, Terence P., and Denzell S. Smith, eds. The Later Jacobean and Caroline Dramatists: A Survey and Bibliography of Recent Studies in English Renaissance Drama. Lincoln, NE, University of Nebraska Press, 1978.
- Oliphant, E. H. C. The Plays of Beaumont and Fletcher: An Attempt to Determine Their Respective Shares and the Shares of Others. New Haven, Yale University Press, 1927.
- Potter, Alfred Claghorn. A Bibliography of Beaumont and Fletcher. Cambridge, MA, Library of Harvard University, 1890.
- Sprague, Arthur Colby. Beaumont and Fletcher on the Restoration Stage. Cambridge, MA, Harvard University Press, 1926.
