= The Guardian (play) =

Play by Philip Massinger

- Original language: English
- Written by: Philip Massinger
- Genre: Drama
- Setting: Naples, Italy

Premiere
- Date: 31 October 1633
- Place: England

The Guardian is a Caroline era stage play, a comedy written by Philip Massinger, dating from 1633. "The play in which Massinger comes nearest to urbanity and suavity is The Guardian...."

== Performance ==
The play was licensed for performance by Sir Henry Herbert, the Master of the Revels, on 31 October 1633. It was performed by the King's Men at the Blackfriars Theatre, and was acted at Court before King Charles I on Sunday 12 January 1634.

== Publication ==
The Guardian was not published until 1655, when it was included in an octavo volume issued by Humphrey Moseley that also contained Massinger's The Bashful Lover and the Fletcher/Massinger collaboration A Very Woman. (When Moseley entered the play into the Stationers' Register in 1653, it was under the title The City Honest Man or The Guardian, a form that appears nowhere else.)

== Sources ==
For the plot of his play, Massinger drew upon traditional story and folktale materials that are expressed in various forms throughout world literature. The Iolante/Calypso subplot can be traced as far back as The Heetopades (Hitopadesha), a collection of traditional Bengali tales, and The Fables of Pilpay; the story was translated into Greek by Simeon Seth, and also occurs in The Decameron of Boccaccio, where it is the eighth story of the seventh day. Massinger also exploited classical literature for his versification in the play, drawing upon the works of Seneca the Younger (Hercules Furens), Terence (Heauton Timonumenos), and Catullus.

== Adaptations ==
During the Restoration era, material from The Guardian was adapted into a droll, titled Love Lost in the Dark, or the Drunken Couple (printed 1680). Aphra Behn borrowed from The Guardian for her play The City Heiress (1682). George Farquhar was influenced by The Guardian when writing his play The Inconstant (1702).

== Synopsis ==
The play is set in the city of Naples and its surrounding countryside. Durazzo is a local gentleman, in his fifties but still lusty, vigorous, and passionate about life. (One character describes him as "jovial and good;" another, less sympathetic, calls him an "angry old ruffian.") Durazzo serves as the legal guardian for his nephew Caldoro, and encourages him to live a life of "rich clothes...horses, games, and wenches" suitable for a gentleman. But Durazzo is disappointed with his nephew, considering him a "milksop" for his unrequited love for the maiden Calista. Calista prefers the rakish Adorio, who would be happy to serve as her lover—but the virtuous Calista wants a husband, and this is not what Adorio has in mind. Caldoro is not wholly spineless, though; in a confrontation with Adorio he strikes his rival, and the two are about to duel when they are separated by other characters.

Calista is the daughter of Severino and Iolante. Severino is a gentleman who had the misfortune to fight a duel with his brother-in-law Monteclaro and to leave the man (apparently) dead on the field of combat. Alphonso, the King of Naples, is adamantly opposed to duelling and refuses to pardon any duelist who has killed a rival. With no hope of pardon, Severino has retreated to the countryside to lead a crew of bandits. Iolante, remaining in Naples, nourishes a sycophantic relationship with her neighbor Calypso, who flatters Iolante at every turn for her virtue. Iolante is unhappy with her daughter Calista over the matter of Adorio and Caldoro; she threatens to lock Calista away from any contact with men. Iolante has a consistency problem, however: she has spied a visiting French nobleman called Laval, and, prompted by Calypso, has developed a passion for him. Calypso acts the part of a bawd, taking a letter to Laval and setting up an assignation between him and Iolante. Laval is wary and suspicious, but curious too. Simultaneously, Calista sends a letter to Adorio by her maid Mirtilla, explaining her restraint and appealing to Adorio to elope with her and marry her.

Adorio is having a change of heart after his near-duel with Caldoro (a psychological development typical of Massinger's dramaturgy). When Mirtilla brings him Calista's letter, he agrees to rescue and marry Calista. Mirtilla, beholding this, falls in love with Adorio herself. Meanwhile, Durazzo convinces Caldoro to take an aggressive approach to his problem and abduct Calista. These competing plot strains come together in a series of night scenes of elaborate mistakings and disguises. (Staged in low light in the enclosed Blackfriars, rather than the open daylight of the Globe Theatre, these scenes could have been highly effective.) Calista sneaks out of her mother's house to meet Adorio, only to encounter Caldoro instead; and Caldoro, prompted by Durazzo, lets her believe that he is Adorio, and escorts her away. Shortly after, Adorio arrives to encounter Mirtilla, who is also fleeing Iolante's house; he mistakes the maid for Calista, and she allows the misapprehension and departs with him.

Severino has sneaked into Naples to visit his home and his wife – and bumps into Laval, coming to keep his appointment for a tryst with Iolante. Laval mistakes Severino for a watchman, and retreats. Severino enters his house by a secret way, and finds his wife in her nightgown, with a banquet and wines laid out; she is clearly expecting a lover. Enraged, he binds Iolante with scarves and searches the house for the lover. In his absence, Calypso finds Iolante, unties her, and takes her place. Severino returns, still angry, having found no lover but realized that his daughter and her maid are missing; in his anger, he torments the woman he thinks is his wife, wounding her arms and her nose with his dagger. In his momentary absence, Iolante returns and takes Calypso's place; when Severino comes back, she feigns prayer, and makes him believe that her wounds have been miraculously healed, as a sign of her innocence and chastity. A repentant Severino takes Iolante to his bandit cave.

After riding off into the country, the two pairs of mismatched lovers eventually discover their errors. Caldoro is able to make a good impression on Calista, and begins to win her favor; Mirtilla placates the angry Adorio, and in a moment of mutual exhaustion they fall asleep under a tree, his head in her lap. They are discovered this way by Caldoro, Calista, and Durazzo, and the sight cures Calista of her infatuation with Adorio. Soon both parties are captured by the "banditti," who lead them to Severino's hideaway along with a third set of travellers, who include Laval and a disguised King Alphonso. In the final scene, the last misunderstandings are cleared way: Laval is revealed to be the supposedly dead Monteclaro, who had been rescued from near death and brought back to health by a travelling French nobleman. With the problem of the fatal duel resolved, the King can pardon Severino and restore him to civil society. Caldoro and Calista are now a happy couple, ready to be wed. Adorio resists the idea of marrying a servant girl – but Severino reveals that Mirtilla is actually of gentle birth, and equips her with a dowry that resolves Adorio's qualms.

Here in The Guardian, Massinger takes the English Renaissance stage convention of disguise and mistaken identity and carries it (Caldoro for Adorio, Mirtilla for Calista, Calypso for Iolante, Monteclaro/Laval, and the disguised King) about as far as any dramatist of the era ever managed to do.

Massinger uses his play to criticize the contemporary craze for duelling, which he also writes against in A Very Woman. The play's Robin-Hood style bandits provide opportunity for social commentary on other issues as well (most prominently in Act II, scene 4).

== Sources ==
- Barroll, John Leeds, ed. Medieval and Renaissance Drama in England: An Annual Gathering of Research, Criticism and Reviews. Volume 7, Madison/Teaneck, NJ, Fairleigh Dickinson University Press, 1995.
- Clark, Ira. The Moral Art of Philip Massinger. Lewisburg, PA, Bucknell University Press, 1993.
- Garrett, Martin. Massinger: The Critical Heritage. London, Routledge, 1991.
- Gifford, William, ed. The Plays of Philip Massinger. One-volume edition, New York, H. B. Mahn, 1857.
- Logan, Terence P., and Denzell S. Smith, eds. The Later Jacobean and Caroline Dramatists: A Survey of Recent Studies in English Renaissance Drama. Lincoln, NE, University of Nebraska Press, 1978.
- McManaway, James G. "Philip Massinger and the Restoration Drama." Journal of English Literary History, Vol. 1 No. 3 (December 1934), pp. 276–304.
- Maxwell, Baldwin. Studies in Beaumont, Fletcher, and Massinger. Chapel Hill, NC, University of North Carolina Press, 1939.
- Oliphant, E. H. C. The Plays of Beaumont and Fletcher. New Haven, Yale University Press, 1927.
- Phelan, James. On Philip Massinger. Halle, E. Karras, 1878.
