= King of the Gypsies =

Multi-contextual title with different meanings

The title King of the Gypsies has been claimed or given over the centuries to many different people. It is both culturally and geographically specific. It may be inherited, acquired by acclamation or action, or simply claimed. The extent of the power associated with the title varied; it might be limited to a small group in a specific place, or many people over large areas. In some cases the claim was clearly a public-relations exercise. As the term Gypsy is also used in many different ways, the King of the Gypsies may be someone with no connection with the Roma.

It has also been suggested that in places where their crimes were prosecuted closely by local authorities the "King of the Gypsies" is an individual, usually of low standing, who places himself in the risky position of an ad hoc liaison between the Roma and the "gadje" (non-Roma). The arrest of such a "King" limited the criminal liability of the Roma.

== Bulgaria ==
=== Mustafa Shibil ===
Mustafa Shibil (killed in 1856) claimed the title during his time in the Balkan Mountains near Sliven during and after the Crimean War.

The Gypsy King is associated with mythical powers of being able to part water with his sword, a spade, and his head, after it had been cut off, according to tales collected in 1981 from the Romani people in Bulgaria.

== England ==
=== Gypsy leaders ===
The Boswells were for centuries one of England's largest and most important Gypsy families. The Boswell clan were a large extended family of Travellers, and in old Nottinghamshire dialect the word bos'll was used as a term for Travellers and Roma in general. Hence, many claiming the title King of the Gypsies come from the Boswell family.

==== Haniel Boswell ====
Was the son of Francis Boswell.

==== Jacob Rewbrey ====
"Alias king of the Gypsies", from the St Margaret's Westminster, was tried at the Old Bailey on 28 August 1700 for theft with violence and highway robbery. It was alleged he had robbed "one Rebecca Sellers, near the High way ... taking from her 3 Gold-rings, and 9 s. in Money" in January of that year. The jury found him guilty of theft, but not robbery, as "It appeared that he juggled [tricked] her out of it." He was sentenced to penal transportation.

==== James Boswell ====
Is buried in Rossington, near Doncaster in Yorkshire. Langdale's "Topographical Dictionary of Yorkshire" (1822), says: "In the church yard, was a stone, the two ends of which are now remaining, where was interred the body of James Bosvill the King of the Gypsies, who died 30 January 1708. For a number of years, it was a custom of Gypsies from the south, to visit his tomb annually, and there perform some of their accustomed rites; one of which was to pour a flagon of ale upon the grave." This is similar to the ritual of "stalling the rogue" mentioned by Thomas Harman and in The Beggars Bush and by Bampfylde Moore Carew.

A tradition was reported of annual visits to the grave of Charles Boswell near Doncaster for more than 100 years into the 1820s, including a rite of pouring a flagon of hot ale into the tomb. This may be the same person. The grave is situated by the main door leading to the church, shaded by a dark oak tree. It is now covered in moss, but is still readable. The words "King Of The Gypsies" will lie there for ever more, whereas the mystery of the black cat is still unsolved. – information on the grave by A. Needham – P. Needham, of St Michaels church.

Robert Boswell

Born c. 1735 in Wiltshire, buried at Loders, Dorset, in January 1806, with his monument reading 'King of the Gypsies'. Robert is likely the father of Lucretia/Lucy, the wife of Josiah Smith. Lucretia died at Halton, Chester; however, her burial took place in Beighton, Derbyshire, for unknown reasons. Lucretia's grave bears in inscription 'Queen of the Gypsies', which has resulted in numerous folktales surrounding her life. In 1998, a pub was constructed nearby and was given the name 'The Gypsy Queen'.

==== Henry Boswell ====
"King of the Gypsies" died in 1760 at the age of 90 and was buried at Ickleford near Hitchin, Hertfordshire at the church of St. Catherine, as were his wife and granddaughter. Royal National and Commercial Directory and Topography of Herts, Pigot & Co., London, 1839

==== Edmund Mashiter ====
Edmund Mashiter a.k.a. "Old Honey", died in Bolton, Lancashire in 1811 aged 90. He was reported to have been "justly entitled the King of Beggars", having been on the road for 70 years. He was reported to have been the son of a schoolmaster, and well educated, but to have taken to the road by choice, and maintained a wandering life until he became bedridden.

==== Henry Boswell ====
The "King of the Gypsies" died in 1824 Stamford, Lincolnshire.

==== Louis Boswell ====
Louis Boswell was buried at Eastwood church, Southend-on-Sea in 1835. In the Burial Register he is described as a "Traveller aged 42" – "This man known as the King of the Gypsies was interred in the presence of a vast concourse of spectators".

==== Inverto Boswell ====
In the churchyard of St Mary's parish church, Calne, Wiltshire, a tomb commemorating Inverto Boswell who was buried on 8 February 1774, son of Henry Boswell King of the Gypsies. It is set in the exterior wall of the church.

==== Harry Burton ====
Described as "King of the Gypsies", died in the Workhouse in Wincanton, Somerset, aged 94 in 1847.

==== Absalom Smith ====
Was noted as King of the Gypsies upon his death, aged 60, in 1826 in Twyford, Leicestershire. His funeral on 10 February 1826 saw over 60 gypsies in attendance. The Manchester Times reported he had been elected as King in the first half of the 19th century and was accorded special burial rites, with the ceremony attended by traveller families from twelve camps. He was a well-known fiddler in the local area, often playing at wakes and celebrations and had a daughter, Beatta Smith, a renowned beauty whose portrait was displayed at Belvoir Castle.

==== Matty Cooper ====
Taught the Romani language in the 1870s to Charles Godfrey Leland (1824–1903), the American folklorist and founder of the Gypsy Lore Society. Leland claimed Cooper was the King of the Gypsies in England.

==== Xavier Petulengro/Smith ====
Was described as the King of the Gypsies. There was an account of a Roma wedding at Baildon in Yorkshire in 1937 between his son Leon Petulengro/ Smith and Illeana Smith both of Colchester Essex. According to the caption of a photograph from then, Xavier Petulengro cut the hands of the couple to mingle their blood during the ceremony. After their wedding the couple went north to Blackpool. During a war, Leon was in the RAF and Ileana (Eileen) was a staff car driver for ICI. The marriage was dissolved in 1947 in Nottingham. Baildon was a famous fair and meeting place for Gypsies. Petulengro/ Smith was well known as a broadcaster on Gypsy subjects. His son Leon Petulengro/ Smith wrote for the "Woman's Own" magazine.

==== Gilderoy Scamp ====
Born in Orpington, Kent in 1812 and was known as the King of the Kentish Gypsies. Lived in Folkestone, Kent and was a boxer and scissor-grinder.

==== Louis Welch ====
Louis Welch of Darlington was described by British media as the "King of the Gypsies", a title given to the best bare-knuckled boxer in the Romanichal who was mainly from the UK and France community. His title was appointed following an alleged attack by six knife-wielding men, possibly from a rival band of travellers, in Cumbria. He refused to give evidence against his attackers, saying it was "against the travellers' code of honour", and a retrial was ordered after the jury failed to reach a verdict.

== Hungary ==
=== Tamás Bolgár ===
He was named as voivode of the "Pharaoh's People" in 1496. He seems to have led a group of metalworkers, as he was supplying the Bishop of Pécs with cannonballs. He was almost certainly the same person granted privileges by the King of Poland and Lithuania in 1501, who also recognised the privileges of Wasili as leader of the "Cyhany."

== Italy ==
=== Scaramuccia ===
This "King of the Gypsies" is suggested as a possible model for "A Grotesque Head" of the sketches of human physiognomy by Leonardo da Vinci, dated to (c.1503-07). Giorgio Vasari reported that Leonardo had done a drawing of "the Gypsy Captain Scaramuccia" which Vasari possessed, but it is not known what happened to it.

== Norway ==
=== Karoli family ===
In the 1980s, Polykarp Karoli began styling himself "King of all Gypsies in Norway".

In 1990, while most of the family was serving prison time, Polykarp's grandson Martin Erik Karoli proclaimed himself "King of One Million Gypsies", claiming to be slated for a centuries-old coronation in Central Europe. After Polykarp's death in 2001, his two sons publicly rivalled for the title "King of All Gypsies in The World", estimating 47.8 million subjects throughout the world and citing various ancient ceremonies and royal registries.

== Poland ==
=== Matiasz Korolewicz ===
Was conferred the title "King of the Gypsies" by the Polish Royal Chancery in 1652, after the death of Janczy who had previously served as the head of the Roma. Later Kings of the Gypsies seem to have been appointed from the aristocracy.

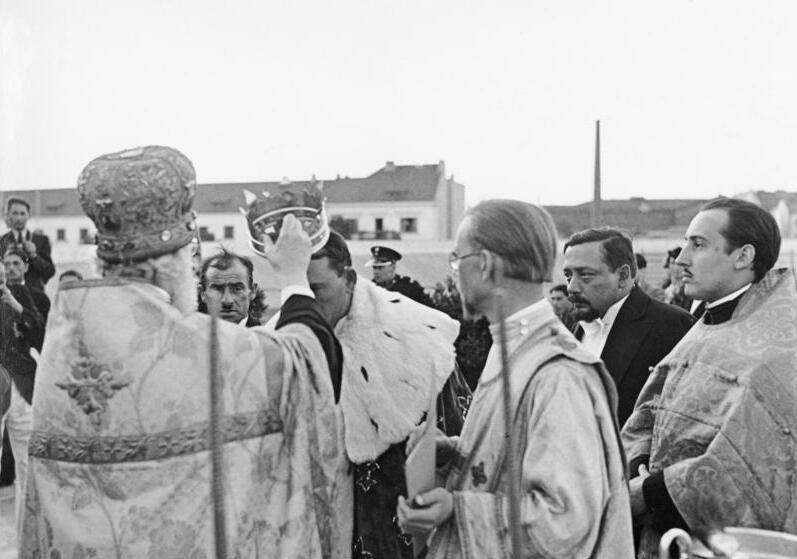
Janos I's coronation in Warsaw, 1937

=== Kwiek family ===
In the Interwar Period, the Kwiek family became almost a "royal dynasty" of the Roma of Poland, with some recognition by local police and government officials. One member of the dynasty, Janusz Kwiek, was crowned in 1937 as Janos I in the Polish Army Stadium in Warsaw before thousands of people. He announced his intention to petition Benito Mussolini for land for a Roma settlement in East Africa, a plan that failed because of Mussolini's alliance with Nazi Germany, which recommended that the Roma population be eliminated.

== Romania ==
=== Iulian Rădulescu ===
In 1993, Iulian Rădulescu proclaimed himself "Emperor of the Roma Everywhere".

=== Florin Cioabă ===
Florin Cioabă acquired the title "King of the Roma Everywhere" in 1997 from his father Ioan Cioabă who had claimed the title in 1992. Reports in 2003 that Cioabă, a Pentecostal Minister, had married off his own daughter at the age of 12 (or 14) caused uproar in the western media. The UN Economic and Social Council visited him in 1999 when preparing a report on Racism and Intolerance and described him as devoting himself to economic activity to support community projects, and exerting "moral authority" and having "some influence" as a councillor. He died on 18 August 2013 after suffering a heart attack while on holiday in Antalya, Turkey. He was succeeded as King by his son Dorin Cioabă.

=== Dorin Cioabă ===
After his father, Florin Cioabă, died in 2013, Dorin Cioabă took on the role of "King of Roma Everywhere". He has been trying ever since to solve one of the recurring issues with Gypsy culture, children getting married at young ages, as he was himself a subject of this practice.

== Scotland ==
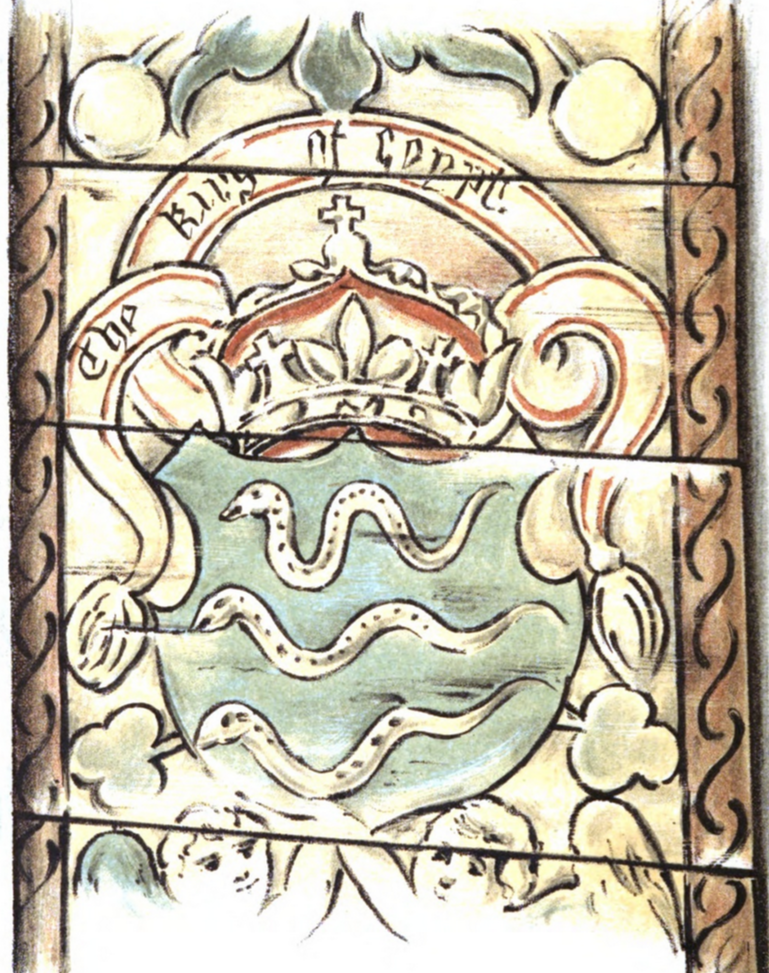
Arms of the "King of Egypt", from Nunraw White Castle armorial.

=== John (Johnnie) Faa ===
Johnnie Faa of Dunbar was leader of the "Egyptians", or Gypsies, in Scotland. Faa was granted a letter under the Privy Seal from King James V in February 1540, which was renewed in 1553. It was addressed to "oure louit Johnne Faw, lord and erle of Litill Egipt" establishing his authority over all Gypsies in Scotland and calling on all sheriffs in the country to assist him "in executione of justice upoun his company and folkis", who were to "conforme to the lawis of Egipt".

He is resurrected in fiction in S. R. Crockett's The Raiders and in Philip Pullman's trilogy His Dark Materials.

=== Johnne Wanne ===
Son and successor of Johnnie Faa, Johnne Wanne was granted Royal authority over all "Egyptians" in Scotland in May 1540.

=== Patrick Faa ===
Patrick was the first recorded Gypsy King at Kirk Yetholm. Along with seven other Gypsies he was "sentenced to be transported to the Queen's American for life."

=== William Faa I ===
King William I, known as 'Gleed Nickit Wull' because of a twist in the shape of his throat, was born about 1700, and died at Coldingham in 1784, aged around 84. He fathered 24 children by three wives. His death at Colingham is recounted by William Smith, the Baillie at Kelso, who states that "When old Will Faa was upwards of eighty years of age, he called on me in Kelso, in his way to Edinburgh, telling me that he was going to Edinburgh to see the laird... before he died," and also that after successfully completing this visit "he only got the length of Colingham, when he was taken ill and died." Will claimed to be descended from Johnnie Faa, Lord of Little Egypt.

=== William Faa II ===
Will Faa, "King of the Gypsies", died in Kirk Yetholm on 9 October 1847, aged 96. He was the son of William Faa I. William Faa was an innkeeper (owned "The Queen") and footballer who lived at "The Gypsy Palace" off the Green, and entertained visitors there. The Kelso Mail carried his obituary entitled "Death of a Gypsy King", which said he was "always accounted a more respectable character than any of his tribe, and could boast of never having been in gaol during his life." His house continued to be a tourist attraction, and there was reportedly an "Old Palace" on the other side of Kirk Yetholm Green. William died without issue in 1847 when the 'Crown' passed to his sister Esther's husband Charles Blythe (1775–1861). Charles was an educated man who did much to live up to his role. On his death in 1861 there was a tussle between his many children for the right to be monarch. The role went to his daughter Esther Faa Blythe who reigned until 1883 when the gypsy culture was in serious decline. Following a gap of several years in 1898 one of her sons Charles Rutherford was persuaded to accept the office and a ceremonial Gypsy Coronation was held in 1898. By this stage the role was largely an attempt to boost tourism. Charles died in 1902 and the title has not been re-established. An Edinburgh housewife is now thought to be the present 'Queen'. A lancet and case belonging to William Faa II can be found in the collections of the National Museum Scotland.

=== Charles Faa Blyth I ===
Charles Faa Blyth was a brother-in-law to William Faa II, and when he died without issue the title of King of the Gypsies was passed to Charles, husband of his sister, Esther. Charles was born in 1775 and died in 1861. He was crowned King, by the local blacksmith, George Gladstone, on 25 October 1847, aged at least 70 years. He was succeeded by his daughter, Esther Faa Blythe, who was born in the early years of the 1800s and died on 12 July 1883. https://www.berwickfriends.org.uk/history/gypsies/

=== Charles Faa Blythe II ===
Born around 1825, Charles Rutherford (known as Charles Faa Blythe II), was a son to Esther Faa Blythe, the Gypsy Queen. Between the death of Esther Faa Blyth in 1883 and the accession of Charles II in 1898, there was no Gypsy royalty crowned at Kirk Yetholm. His coronation ceremony was really a pageant, with all the locals dressing up for the benefit of the photographers. Many photographs of the occasion still exist.

=== William (Billy) Marshall ===
William (Billy) Marshall (1672–1792) died aged 120, lived in Minnigaff, Kirkcudbrightshire, Galloway, Scotland. He is buried in the graveyard at St Cuthbert's Church in Kirkcudbright.

== United States ==
=== Tom "Thoma" Miller ===
Who had lived in New York City, was claimed by many as King until his death in 1990. Tom Miller made a brief cameo in the movie Angelo My Love directed by Robert Duvall, a film showcasing life in Roma America in the 1970s.

=== Kelly Mitchell, Queen of the Gypsy Nation ===
Was a Romani woman who was celebrated as a leader of the Romani people in the US state of Mississippi.[1] Her grave continues to be visited by thousands of people each year,[1] and is one of the most important landmarks in Meridian.[2] A document found in the Lauderdale County Department of Archives and History says she was born in Brazil.

=== Phoebe Broadway Stanley ===
Known for being horse dealers, the Stanleys are Romanichal and arrived in the United States from England in 1857 on a ship called the SS Kangaroo. Those that settled in the Northeast had many "Queens" and "Kings". Phoebe Broadway Stanley (1859–1940) was married to Thomas Stanley and lived her later years in Natick, Massachusetts, where her colorful Vardo (Roma wagon) was spotted in her son's yard by a local antiques dealer, who purchased the wagon from the Stanleys and subsequently donated it to the Long Island Museum of American Art, History, and Carriages where it was restored and now resides.

=== Unidentified Romany ===
In 1953, Anaïs Nin underwent surgery for ovarian cancer in a Los Angeles hospital. In her diary, she mentions that "the King of the Gypsies was having surgery at the same time" and that approximately six hundred members of his tribe were camped in or near the hospital in accordance with their law: "no amount of hospital discipline would drive them away". She spoke with several members of the band, and identified them as Roma people.

== Venezuela ==
=== Angelo Vallerugo III ===
Since 1998, Angelo Vallerugo III has been accepted by the Venezuelan gypsy community as their king.

== Wales ==
=== Abram Wood ===
Abram Wood was the head of a family of Welsh Roma people in the 1700s. They were musicians, and spoke an old Roma dialect.

== Turkey ==
=== Kuştepeli Erdin ===
From 2005 until his death in 2017, the Muslim Roma Kuştepeli Erdin was the self-proclaimed King of all Romani people in Turkey. He lived in Kuştepe-Şişli in Istanbul.

== In popular culture ==
The heavyweight champion boxer Tyson Fury is nicknamed "the Gypsy King". He is related to Bartley Gorman, who claimed the title of "King of the Gypsies" on the basis of his prowess at bare-knuckle boxing.

The classic daytime gothic television series Dark Shadows featured a fictional King of the Gypsies named Johnny Romano during the 1897 arc.

== See also ==
- Rom baro – Romani tribal leader
- Gilderoy Scamp
