= Thomas Harman (writer) =

16th-century English writer on beggars and criminals

Thomas Harman (fl. 1567) was an English writer best known for his seminal work on beggars, A Caveat or Warning for Common Cursitors.

== Life ==
He was the grandson of Henry Harman, clerk of the crown under Henry VII, who obtained, around 1480, the estates of Ellam and Maystreet in Kent. Thomas's father, William Harman, added to these estates the manor of Mayton or Maxton in the same county. As his father's heir, Thomas inherited all this property, and lived at Crayford, Kent, continuously from 1547. That he was a member of the gentry is evidenced by the coat of arms stamped on his pewter plate and he appears to have been a local Commissioner of the Peace. As a magistrate, he was responsible for implementing the new laws against beggary enacted by Henry VIII. He writes that he was "a poore gentleman", detained in the country by ill-health. He found some recreation in questioning the vagrants who begged at his door as to their modes of life and paid frequent visits to London with the object of corroborating his information. He thus acquired a unique knowledge of the habits of thieves and beggars. Occasionally, his indignation was so roused by the deception practised by those whom he interrogated at his own door that he took their licenses from them and confiscated their money, distributing it among the honest poor of his neighbourhood.

In 1554 and 1555, Harman was appointed to the Commission of Sewers for Kent, which was responsible for the River Thames from Ravensbourne to Gravesend bridge.

== A Caveat or Warning for Common Cursitors ==
Before 1566, Harman had composed an elaborate treatise on vagrants and come to London to superintend its publication. He lodged at the cloister in Whitefriars and continued his investigation even while his book was passing through the press. Of the first edition, issued in 1566 or very early in 1567, no copy is known. Its popularity was at once so great that Henry Bynneman and Gerrard Dewes were both fined by the Stationers' Company in 1567, for attempting to circulate pirated copies. Of the second edition two copies, differing in many particulars, are extant. One is in the Bodleian Library (dated 8 Jan. 1567–8), and in 1890 the other belonged to Alfred Henry Huth (dated "Anno Domini 1567"). The former is doubtless the earlier of the two, neither of which seems to have been published till early in 1568. Both were issued by William Griffith. The title ran in the later copy, A Caueat or Warening for commen cvrsetors Vvlgarely called Vagabones. A dedication by Harman to his neighbour, Elizabeth, Countess of Shrewsbury, widow of the 4th Earl, who held the manor of Erith and "the epistle to the reader" is followed by exhaustive small essays on 24 classes of the thieves' and tramps' fraternity, and by a list of names of the chief professors of the art "lyuinge nowe at this present". A vocabulary of "their pelting speche" or cant terms concludes the volume, which is embellished by a few woodcuts, including one of "an upright man, Nicolas Blunt", and another of "a counterfeit cranke, Nicolas Genynges". Harman borrowed something from The Fraternitye of Vacabondes, by John Awdelay, which was probably first issued in 1561, although the earliest edition now known is dated 1575; but Harman's information is far fuller and fresher than Awdelay's, and was very impudently plagiarised by later writers. The Groundworke of conny-catching (1592), very doubtfully assigned to Robert Greene, reprints the greater part of Harman's book. Thomas Dekker, in his Belman of London (1608), made free use of it, and Samuel Rowlands exposed Dekker's theft in his Martin Mark-all, Beadle of Bridewell (Lond. 1610). Dekker, in the second part of his Belman, called Lanthorne and Candlelight (1609), conveyed to his pages Harman's vocabulary of thieves' words, which Richard Head incorporated in his "English Rogue" (1671–80). Harman's vocabulary is the basis of the later slang dictionaries (cf. among others, that forming the appendix to 'Memoires of John Hall' (d. 1707) (see Jack Hall), 1708). Another edition of Harman's Caueat appeared in 1573, and this was reprinted by Machell Stace in 1814. A carefully collated edition of the second edition was edited by Dr. Frederick Furnival and Edward Viles for the Early English Text Society in 1869 and re-issued by the New Shakspeare Society in 1880.

== Personal life ==
Harman married Anne, daughter of Sir Edward Rogers. Their eldest daughter, Anne (d.1574), married merchant taylor Robert Draper of Crayford.
