= 1624 in literature =

This article contains information about the literary events and publications of 1624.

== Events ==
- January 18 – The King's Men perform William Shakespeare's The Winter's Tale at Whitehall Palace.
- August 5–14 – The King's Men perform Thomas Middleton's satire A Game at Chess at the Globe Theatre, London, until it is suppressed in view of its allusions to the Spanish Match.
- August 26 – Ferdinand II, Holy Roman Emperor, requires the legal deposit of new books to the Hof-Bibliothek' ("Imperial Library") in Vienna, the modern-day Austrian National Library.
- December – The King's Men get into further trouble for performing Philip Massinger's The Spanish Viceroy without a licence from the Master of the Revels.
- December 20 – The King's Men provide Sir Henry Herbert (Master of the Revels) with a "submission," a written apology, signed by each actor who had taken part in The Spanish Viceroy earlier in the month. The signatories include Robert Benfield, George Birch, John Lowin, Thomas Pollard, John Rice, Richard Robinson, William Rowley, John Shank, Richard Sharpe, Eliard Swanston, and Joseph Taylor.

== New books ==
=== Prose ===
- Anonymous – The Origin of Idolatry (falsely attributed to Isaac Casaubon)
- Jean Louis Guez de Balzac – Lettres
- Jacob Boehme – The Way of Christ
- George Carleton – Astrologomania, the Madnesse of Astrologes; or, an Examination of Sir Christopher Heydon's Booke, intituled, A Defence of Judiciarie Astrologie
- Philipp Clüver – Italia Antiqua (posthumous)
- John Donne – Devotions upon Emergent Occasions
- Antonio Vázquez de Espinosa
  - Viaje y Navegación del año de 1622 que hizo la flota de Nueva España y Honduras
  - Circunstancias para los tratos y contratos de las Indias del Perú y Nueva España
- Edward Herbert, 1st Baron Herbert of Cherbury – De Veritate (On Truth)
- Tirso de Molina – Cigarrales de Toledo
- Jens Munk – Navigatio Septentrionalis (An account of a most dangerous voyage)
- Martin Opitz – Buch von der Deutschen Poeterey (putting forward formal rules for German poetry)
- Captain John Smith – The Generall Historie of Virginia, New-England, and the Summer Isles
- Edward Winslow – Good Newes from New England, or a True Relation of Things very Remarkable at the Plantation of Plimouth in New England
- Sir Henry Wotton – The Elements of Architecture (translation of Vitruvius)

=== Drama ===
- Anonymous – Nero (published)
- Robert Davenport – The City Nightcap
- Thomas Drue – The Duchess of Suffolk
- Feliciana Enríquez de Guzmán – Los jardines y campos sabeos (published)
- John Ford and Thomas Dekker – The Sun's Darling
- Ben Jonson – Neptune's Triumph for the Return of Albion
- Philip Massinger
  - The Parliament of Love
  - The Bondman (published)
- Thomas Middleton – A Game at Chess

=== Poetry ===
- Bernardo de Balbuena – El Bernardo

== Births ==
- February 11 – Ivan Ančić, Croatian theologian (died 1685)
- October 30 – Paul Pellisson, French historian (died 1693)
- November 2 (baptised) – Edward Howard, English playwright and poet (died 1712)
- unknown date – Francesc Mulet, Spanish comic writer (died 1675)

== Deaths ==
- February 4 – Vicente Espinel, Spanish writer and musician (born 1550)
- February 13 – Stephen Gosson, English satirist (born 1544)
- February 16 – Luis de la Puente, Spanish theologian (born 1554)
- February 24 – Paul Laurentius, German theologian (born 1544)
- August – George Wyatt, English biographer (born 1553)
- November 17 – Jakob Böhme, German theologian (born 1575)
- December 9 – Flaminio Scala, Italian actor and dramatist (born 1575)
- December 15 – Jerónimo Bautista Lanuza, Spanish bishop and writer (born 1533)
- unknown date (latest possible year) – Mark Ridley, English lexicographer of Russian and physician (born 1560)
