= The Little French Lawyer =

Stage play by John Fletcher and Philip Massinger

The Little French Lawyer is a Jacobean era stage play, a comedy written by John Fletcher and Philip Massinger. It was initially published in the first Beaumont and Fletcher folio of 1647.

== Date ==
Definite information on the play's date of authorship and early performance history is lacking. Scholars generally date the play to the 1619–23 period. The second Beaumont/Fletcher folio of 1679 provides a cast list for the play, which includes Joseph Taylor, Nicholas Tooley, John Lowin, William Ecclestone, John Underwood, Richard Sharpe, Robert Benfield, and Thomas Holcombe. This is the same cast of actors from the King's Men that the folio gives for The Custom of the Country and Women Pleased, plays that are thought to date from the same era. These plays must have premiered between the Spring of 1619, when Taylor joined the troupe, and June 1623, when Tooley died.

== Authorship ==
Given Fletcher's highly distinctive style and mannerisms, the division of shares of authorship in the play is relatively clear. Cyrus Hoy offered a delineation that generally agreed with those of other critics:

Massinger – Act I; Act III, scene 3; Act IV, 5; Act V, 3;
Fletcher – Act II; Act III, scenes 1, 2, and 4; Act IV, 1–4; Act V, 2;
Fletcher and Massinger – Act IV, scenes 6–7; Act V, 1.

The play's closing couplet is similar to the closing couplet in The Sea Voyage, another of the dramatists' collaborations.

The Little French Lawyer provides repeated displays of the two playwrights' habit of re-using characters' names from play to play. Dinant, Cleremont, Lamira and Beaupre all re-appear in Massinger's The Parliament of Love; Cleremont also previously appeared in Fletcher's Philaster and The Noble Gentleman. Lamira and Charlotte are used in The Honest Man's Fortune, and Verdon is found in Rollo Duke of Normandy.

== Sources ==
The plot of the play is based on a story by Massuccio di Salerno (his Il novellino, novella xli), perhaps in the version in Guzmán de Alfarache by Mateo Alemán (1599, 1605). The plot bears resemblances with several other plays of the era – the Beaumont and Fletcher play The Scornful Lady, John Marston's The Dutch Courtesan, Massinger's The Parliament of Love, and A Cure for a Cuckold, by John Webster and William Rowley.

== In the Restoration ==
The play was revived during the Restoration era, being performed at the Inner Temple in 1670, probably at Candlemas, 2 February. It was staged again in 1717; and scenes from the play were adapted for a farce, acted under the play's name at Drury Lane in 1749.

== Synopsis ==
The play is set in Paris, and opens with two Frenchmen, the friends Dinant and Cleremont, discussing the ethics and manners of duelling. Dinant is disconsolate, because the woman he loves, Lamira, is marrying a rich old man named Champernell. Champernell won fame and fortune fighting at sea; but now he is crippled in an arm and a leg. Dinant and Cleremont confront the wedding party as they leave the church; the two mock and insult the new-made man and wife. Champernell tries to fight back, but his injuries prevent him; both groom and bride are reduced to tears of frustration (him) and embarrassment (her). They are not without defenders, however: afterward, Lamira's brother Beaupre and Champernell's nephew Verdone meet Dinant and Cleremont, and challenge them to meet on the "field of honor".

The challenge is spied upon, by Lamira's old Nurse; Lamira foresaw this event, and is terrified that her brother will be killed by Dinant. To avoid this, Lamira summons Dinant, and complains that her honor has been insulted. Dinant agrees to meet her slanderer and defend her, even though he will miss his appointment with Beaupre and Verdone. Cleremont makes that appointment in a cold dawn, and is distressed to find himself alone against two potential combatants. To avoid fighting both or yielding his sword, he must obtain a second. He solicits passers-by but finds no one, until he encounters a diminutive lawyer named La-Writ, who is poring over his court documents as he walks toward the city. Cleremont manages to bully, cajole, and persuade the attorney to second him in the duel, even though La-Writ has never drawn his sword in anger in his life. Through a stroke of beginner's luck, La-Writ manages to disarm Beaupre, and then rescue Cleremont by disarming Verdone too. The two losers have to return to the city without their swords, and a buoyant-spirited La-Writ resumes his way.

Meanwhile, Dinant has wasted two hours, waiting to encounter a person who does not exist. As he suspects he's been fooled, he meets a swaggering and wild-talking La-Writ, and believes he's found the man he means to fight. Before they can duel, Cleremont breaks in upon them, and informs Dinant that the little lawyer is the man who saved his honor by taking his place in the morning's duel. La-Writ is now so transported with exaltation that he neglects his law practice to devote his time to quarreling with the town bravos.

When Champernell learns that Verdone and Beaupre have been defeated, he is irate and disgusted. Verdone explains that Dinant did not appear that morning, but that his place was taken by "a Devil hir'd from some Magician,/ I'th' shape of an Attorney". Verdone accuses Dinant of cowardice – and Lamira surprises everyone by defending her former suitor's reputation. Champernell is distressed and angered by this; but Lamira takes the upper hand by threatening to run away if he doubts her virtue. Her husband backs down, and Lamira decides to teach Dinant a lesson for hoping to make her an adulteress.

Lamira summons Dinant to a tryst; Cleremont comes with him. To complete their tryst, Lamira tells Cleremont that he must take her place in bed with her husband: the old man has a habit of reaching out to feel if she's still in bed, and if he feels no one, he'll be alarmed. Cleremont is humiliated to be put in this position – but his friendship for Dinant leads him to agree. Dinant thinks that he will finally enjoy Lamira; but she talks loudly, lights the lights, and has music played, spoiling the secrecy of the moment. It turns out that Cleremont has been lying in bed not with the old man, but with his sixteen-year-old niece Anabel. Champernell, Beaupre, and Verdone laugh at the discomfiture of their two rivals.

La-Writ is now so passionate about quarreling that he fails to appear in court, and his cases are dismissed by the judge Vertaigne (who is also Lamira's father). La-Writ writes a challenge to the judge, and asks Cleremont to deliver it. This presents Cleremont with a dilemma: the code of duelling will not allow him to refuse to deliver the challenge – but delivering it to a judge will quickly land him in jail. He handles the matter by pretending that the challenge is a joke. Vertaigne takes it so, and sends his kinsman Sampson, another lawyer, to meet La-Writ in his place. When the two meet, their seconds, in pretending to observe the punctilios of the duelling code, deprive them of their swords and doublets – and then run off, leaving the two would-be duellists without swords, horses, or coats in the cold morning air.

Dinant and Cleremont plan to gain revenge on those who have embarrassed them. As Champernell, Vertaigne and their party are travelling to a country house, they are waylaid by a group of pretended bandits. Dinant and Cleremont appear to come to their rescue, and in the tumult and confusion the party is separated and the two old men are left alone in the woods. Champernell and Vertaigne soon stumble into La-Writ and Sampson. La-Writ is still talking big, full of his fictitious prowess; an irritated Champernell finally knocks him to the ground. Sampson is driven off, and Champernell beats La-Writ until the repentant attorney agrees to give up fighting and return to lawyering once again.

In the clutches of the feigned bandits, Lamira is frightened, but Anabel is determined to fight to preserve her honor. Cleremont, pretending to be a rescuer, absconds with Anabel to a waiting priest. Dinant confronts Lamira, who is repentant for tricking him, but still determined to preserve her virtue; and Dinant reconciles with her. At the end of the play, hard feelings are dispelled with a new understanding and tolerance, and a new couple in Cleremont and Anabel.

== Stagecraft ==
When Champernell is introduced in the play's opening scene, the text states that he has suffered "The loss of a leg and an arm" – raising the question of how this was managed in the original stage production.
