= Francis Kirkman =

17th-century English literary figure

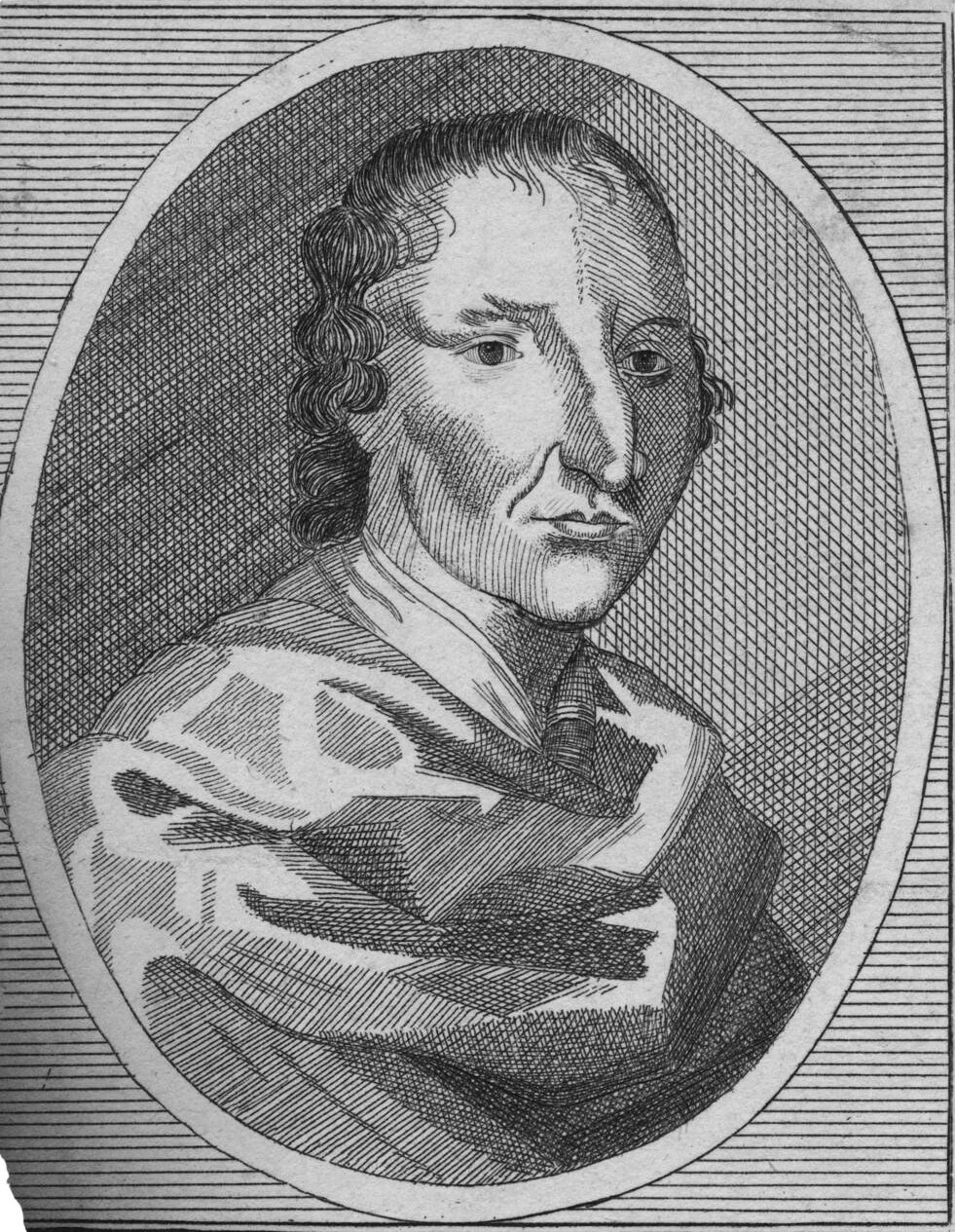
A 1798 engraving of Kirkman

Francis Kirkman (1632 – c. 1680) appears in many roles in the English literary world of the second half of the seventeenth century, as a publisher, bookseller, librarian, author and bibliographer. In each he is an enthusiast for popular literature and a popularising businessman, described by one modern editor as "hovering on the borderline of roguery".

== Early life ==
Francis Kirkman was the eldest son of Francis Kirkman senior (1602–61), who was a member of the Blacksmith's Company and a citizen of the City of London. Little is known of the younger Kirkman's life beyond his publications. He wrote The Unlucky Citizen (1673), which is taken to be autobiographical, though Kirkman was anything but reliable. However, the part in which he refers to his discovery of literature rings true, and is a good example of his style and enterprise:

Once I happened upon a Six Pence, and having lately read that famous Book, of the Fryar and the Boy, and being hugely pleased with that, as also the excellent History of the Seven Wise Masters of Rome, and having heard great Commendation of Fortunatus, I laid out all my mony for that, and thought I had a great bargain ... now having read this Book, and being desirous of reading more of that nature; one of my School-fellows lent me Doctor Faustus, which also pleased me, especially when he travelled in the Air, saw all the World, and did what he listed.... The next Book I met with was Fryar Bacon, whose pleasant Stories much delighted me: But when I came to Knight Errantry, and reading Montelion Knight of the Oracle, and Ornatus and Artesia, and the Famous Parisimus; I was contented beyond measure, and (believing all I read to be true) wished my self Squire to one of these Knights: I proceeded on to Palmerin of England, and Amadis de Gaul; and borrowing one Book of one person, when I read it my self, I lent it to another, who lent me one of their Books; and thus robbing Peter to pay Paul, borrowing and lending from one to another, I in time had read most of these Histories. All the time I had from School, as Thursdays in the afternoon, and Saturdays, I spent in reading these Books; so that I being wholly affected to them, [sic] and reading how that Amadis and other Knights not knowing their Parents, did in time prove to be Sons of Kings and great Personages; I had such a fond and idle Opinion, that I might in time prove to be some great Person, or at leastwise be Squire to some Knight.

As will be seen, Kirkman’s enthusiasm for some of these books led him to publish them himself. He claims to have been forbidden to travel or be apprenticed into the book trade, and to have run away from the first scrivener to whom he was apprenticed.

== Publisher and bookseller ==
Upon being apprenticed to another scrivener he installed his collection of novels and plays in his office, before selling many of them to finance the publication of his own translation of the sixth book of Amadis de Gaul (1652). It is characteristic that Kirkman's first publication was his own extension of a work already popular. His entrepreneurial talents were always directed towards the popular, or vulgar, end of the book trade. Although he became a freeman of the Blacksmith's Company he was never a member of the Stationers' Company.

From 1652 he operated as a scrivener and bookseller from a small shop near the Tower of London, and continued to trade from various premises in Thames Street, Fenchurch Street and Paul's Yard until 1680. From 1657 he was publishing plays, although his partnership with Henry Marsh, Nathaniel Brook and Thomas Johnson ended after they were accused of pirating books, probably an edition of Beaumont and Fletcher's The Scornful Lady. He also claimed to have been swindled by Marsh, whose business he took over after his death in 1666. Kirkman had received a substantial inheritance on his father's death in 1661, which he squandered, and although he had an entrepreneurial spirit he suffered continual financial problems.

Kirkman published many early novels, including many translated from French and Spanish. In 1652 he published The Loves and Adventures of Clerio and Lozia, which he also claimed was translated from French. One of his greatest successes was a novel, The English Rogue the first volume of which was written by Richard Head, and published in 1665. In 1666 Kirkman re-issued this, and then wrote a second volume in his own name (1668), followed by a third and fourth (1671), claiming Head as a co-author. In 1673 Kirkman wrote and issued under his own name The Counterfeit Lady Unveiled, a fictional autobiography of Mary Carleton, an impostor and bigamist. He also published other popular romances, such as The Famous and Delectable History of Don Bellianus of Greece, (1671–1674), The Seven Wise Masters of Rome (1674).

Kirkman also became increasingly interested in theatre. In 1661 he published his own play The Presbyterian Lash, based on the notorious story of Zachary Crofton, a minister accused of whipping his maidservant. Kirkman had a penchant for the picaresque in literature, and in attributions. He also collected manuscripts, which he published, including A Cure for a Cuckold and The Thracian Wonder (both 1661), and both correctly attributed to John Webster and William Rowley. In 1662 he published The Birth of Merlin, wrongly attributed by him to William Shakespeare and William Rowley. This has been described as "a medley in which legendary history, love romance, sententious praise of virginity, rough and tumble clown-play, necromancy and all kinds of diablerie jostle each other". He was also involved in the publication of plays pirated from other printers. For instance, Kirkman in 1661 published The Beggars Bush by John Fletcher, Francis Beaumont, and Philip Massinger, pirated from Humphrey Robinson & Anne Moseley. Their hurried second printing contains a notice;

You may speedily expect those other Playes, which Kirkman, and his Hawkers have deceived the buyers withal, selling them at treble the value, that this and the rest will be sold for, which are the onely Originall and corrected copies, as they were first purchased by us at no mean rate, and since printed by use.

== Theatrical bibliography ==
Kirkman's greatest contribution to literary history is his catalogues of plays. In 1671 he wrote "I have been these twenty years a Collector of plays, and have conversed with, and enquired of those that have been Collecting these fifty years". Kirkman's catalogues expanded upon two earlier lists, published in the first quartos of The Careless Shepherdess and The Old Law (both 1656).

The first catalogue, attached to an edition of Tom Tyler and his Wife (1661), included 690 plays published England. Kirkman claimed to have read them all, and be ready to sell or lend them, "upon reasonable considerations". In 1671 he expanded to list 806 plays, attached to a translation of Pierre Corneille's Nicomede. For the first time he listed them not by title, but by author, for the most popular authors. Kirkman listed 52 plays attributed to Francis Beaumont and John Fletcher, with Ben Jonson the next most productive at 50, and William Shakespeare third with 48. This was probably an accurate representation of their comparative popularity at the time. It must also be an indication of his reputation that Kirkman advertised books for sale at the sign of The John Fletcher's Head, only the second author thought worthy of this, (the first being Jonson). Shakespeare never This list provided the basis for the work of Gerard Langbaine, which became the main source for English drama to the end of the seventeenth century.

== Circulating library ==
From the above Kirkman is taken to have operated what amounted to the first circulating library, based on his collection, starting in 1660, in Westminster and moving to Bishopsgate by 1669.

== The Wits (Drolls) ==
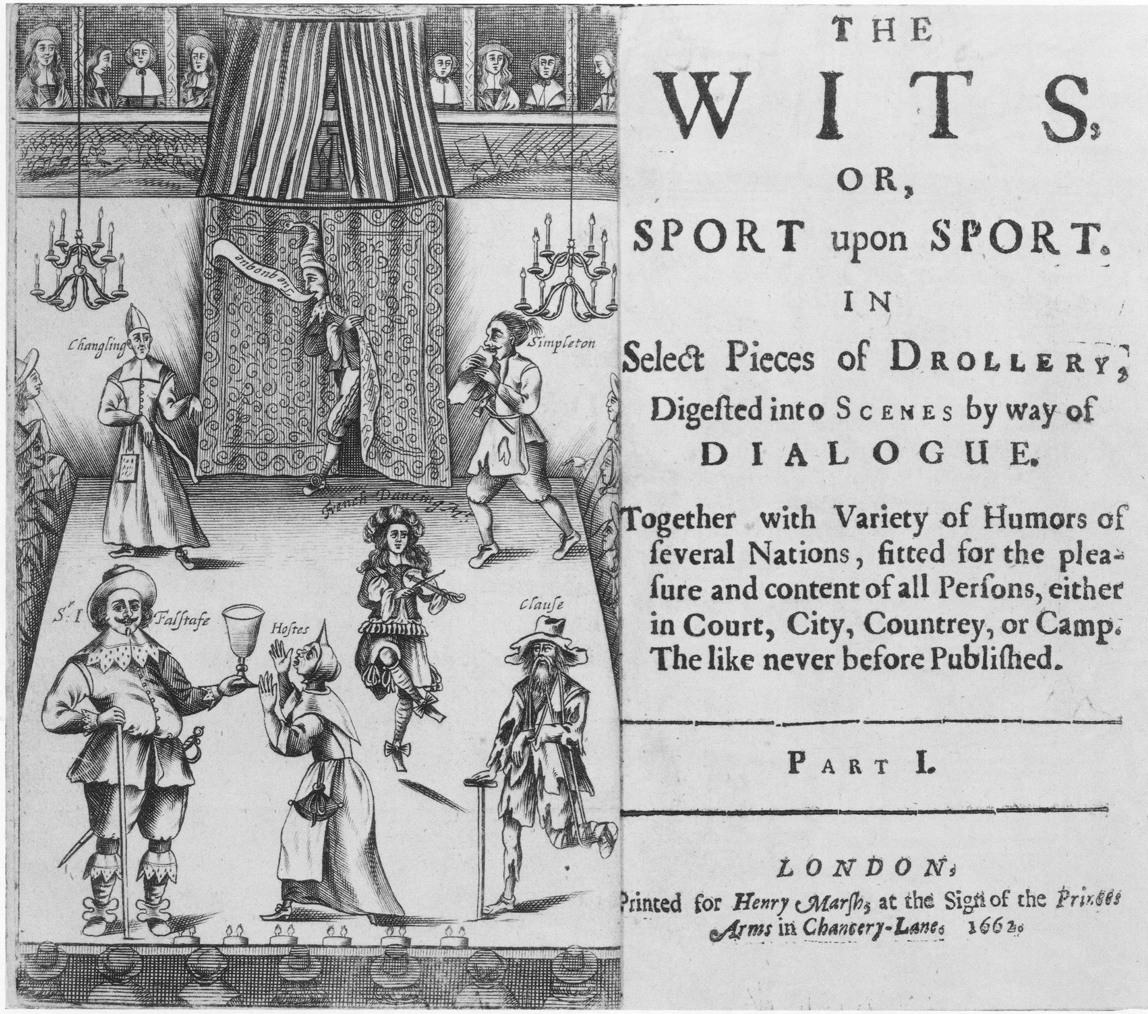
Frontispiece to The Wits or Sport upon Sport (London, 1662). Attributed to Francis Kirkman.

Also significant in the history of theatre was Kirkman's collection of drolls, The Wits, or Sport for Sport. The first part was published by Henry Marsh in 1662, but seems very likely to have been prepared by Kirkman before they fell into dispute and litigation. Marsh was a member of the Stationers' Company, and seems to have acted as printer and bookseller, with Kirkman acting as publisher and editor. It was described as Part I, but Part II did not appear until after Marsh had died and Kirkman had taken over his business. In 1672 Kirkman re-issued Part I, and issued Part II in 1673.

Kirkman said, disingenuously, that the pieces were "written I know not when, by several persons, I know not who", though he included items such as the gravediggers' scene from Hamlet, and the bouncing knight from The Merry Wives of Windsor, the authorship of which cannot have been unknown either to him or his audience. He attributed some to an actor, Robert Cox, who had published his own drolls, and probably performed them at the Red Bull Theatre, and outside London.

The Wits went through many editions in the next two decades. Kirkman described the contents as : –

Selected pieces of drollery, digested into scenes by way of dialogue; together with variety of humours of several nations, fitted for the pleasure and content of all persons, either in court, city, country, or camp . . . presented and shewn for the merriment and delight of wise men, and the ignorant, as they have been sundry times acted in publique, and private, in London at Bartholomew in the countrey at other faires, in halls and taverns, on several mountebancks stages, at Charing Cross, Lincolns-Inn-Fields, and other places, by several stroleing players, fools, and fidlers, and the mountebancks zanies, with loud laughter, and great applause.

Kirkman said the pieces were selected because of their popularity during the Commonwealth between 1642 and 1660, when the theatres were officially closed: –

When the publique Theatres were shut up... then all that we could divert ourselves with were these humours and pieces of Plays, which passing under the name of a merry conceited Fellow, called Bottom the Weaver, Simpleton the Smith, John Swabber, or some such title, were only allowed us, and that but by stealth too, and under the pretence of Rope-dancing, or the like; and these being all that was permitted to us, great was the confluence of the Auditors; and these small things were as profitable as any of our late famed Plays. I have seen the Red Bull Play-House, which was a large one, so full, that as many went back for want of room as had entered; and as meanly as you may think these Drolls, they were then acted by the best Comedeians then and now in being; and I may say, by some exceeded all now living ...

He recommends the work for those reading for pleasure, fiddlers, mountebanks seeking a crowd, those undertaking long sea voyages, and strolling players, as “a few ordinary properties is enough to set them up, and get money in any Town in England”. The extent to which these drolls were performed is almost impossible to tell. Some of the contents of The Wits were almost certainly edited by Kirkman from the many play scripts he owned. However, some of the drolls are known from versions that date before 1620. This suggests that, like so many plays, they existed in manuscript for many years before they were published. One droll, The Lame Commonwealth, a canting interlude extracted from The Beggars Bush, includes an additional section which seems to record stagecraft. Another droll from The Wits, Daphilo & Granida, is based on the play Granida by P.C. Hooft. Baskervill (1924) notes that a Christmas play collected from Keynsham, Somerset in 1822 contains a passage exhibiting a striking similarity to a passage from Daphilo & Granida, which suggests the text of Kirkman's droll was adapted for use in the folk play.

The Wits is also known for the frontispiece by John Chantry. This is often assumed to represent the Red Bull Theatre, although this is disputed as being unlikely; it is not described as such before 1809, and is not consistent with what is known of it. It is one of the earliest illustrations of a theatre interior, showing chandeliers and lighting at the front of the stage, a curtained entrance, which may be genuine representations. However, the various characters shown are a catalogue, not an example of a scene as staged. They include Falstaff (by far the most popular theatrical character of the seventeenth century), a hostess, (perhaps Mistress Quickly), Clause (from The Lame Commonwealth), French Dancing Mr, (a dancing fiddler), The Changeling, and Simpleton, a character played by Cox.

== Sources and further reading ==
The National Portrait Gallery, London has a portrait of Kirkman by an unknown artist dated 1673

- Old DNB and DNB Francis Kirkman
- Gibson, Strickland, (1949), A bibliography of Francis Kirkman with his prefaces dedications and commendations, Oxford Bibliographical Society.
- Elson, John James, ed., (1932), Kirkman, Francis The Wits, or Sport Upon Sport.(Cornell) Also available online at EEBO
- Wright, Louis B, (1934) Middle Class Culture in Elizabethan England, Chapel Hill, pp. 86–7
- Masten, Jeffrey, (2000) Ben Jonson's Head, Shakespeare Studies, 05829399, 2000, Vol. 28, MAS Online Plus
- W. van Lennep, et al., The London Stage 1660–1800, p. 80.
- Baskervill, C.R. (1924) Mummers' Wooing Plays in England, Modern Philology, Feb.1924, Vol.21, No.3, pp. 225–272, pp. 268–272, extracted at https://www.folkplay.info/Texts/67tq37kf.htm & https://www.folkplay.info/Texts/82st66hs.htm
- Astington, J., "'The Wits' illustration, 1662" Theatre Notebook 47, 1993, p. 128
- Astington, John H., Callot's Etchings and Illustrations of the English Stage in the Seventeenth Century, at http://www.theatrelibrary.org/sibmas/congresses/sibmas90/sto_11.html
