= The Maid of Honour =

1632 play by Philip Massinger

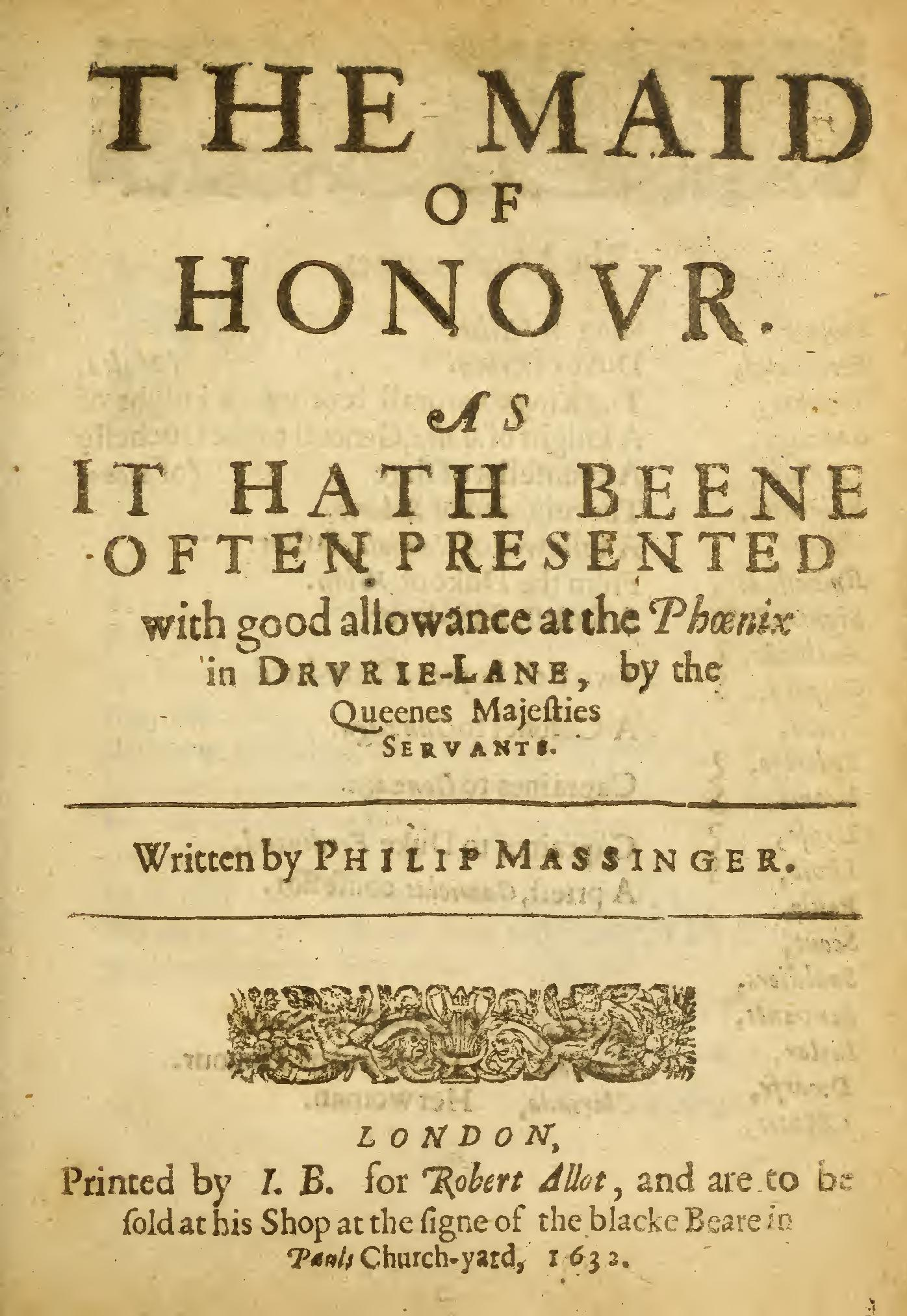
Title page

The Maid of Honour is a Jacobean era stage play, a tragicomedy written by Philip Massinger, first published in 1632. It may be Massinger's earliest extant solo work.

== Performance ==
Firm data on the play's date of authorship and initial theatrical production have not survived; scholars estimate a date in the early 1620s, perhaps 1621–23. The title page of the earliest edition states that the play was acted by Queen Henrietta's Men at the Cockpit Theatre—though that company did not exist under that name prior to 1625. The title page may refer to performances in the 1625–32 period rather than the work's debut.

John Philip Kemble, an admirer of Massinger's dramas, staged an adaptation of the play called Camiola, or The Maid of Honour, at Drury Lane in 1785. It starred his sister Sarah Siddons; but it was not a success, and lasted only three performances.

== Publication ==
The 1632 quarto, published by the bookseller Robert Allot, bore a commendatory poem by Massinger's friend Sir Aston Cockayne, which indicates that the publication of The Maid of Honour followed that of The Emperor of the East in the same year. The quarto bears Massinger's dedication of the play to two of his patrons, Sir Francis Foljambe, 1st Baronet and Sir Thomas Bland, 1st Baronet, in gratitude for their "frequent courtesies and favours." A second quarto appeared in 1638.

== Synopsis ==
The play is set in Palermo and Siena in Italy. The court of King Roberto of Sicily receives an ambassador from Roberto's ally Ferdinand, the duke of Urbino. Ferdinand has launched a military assault on the duchy of Siena, because the duchess, Aurelia, has refused his proposal of marriage. Ferdinand and his forces have taken Siena, but now face a vigorous counterattack, led by the general Gonzaga, a member of the Knights of Malta. Ferdinand has sent an appeal to his ally Roberto for help. Roberto, however, responds that the alliance between Sicily and Urbino is purely defensive in nature—the two have promised to come to each other's aid if attacked. The alliance does not cover aggressive warfare; and on that basis Roberto refuses to send any troops.

The King's sensible decision is protested by his "natural" (illegitimate) half-brother Bertoldo, another Knight of Malta. Bertoldo is a fiery character who has his own following among the kingdom's younger nobility and gentry, and he criticises his brother's caution and passivity. Roberto allows Bertoldo to lead a contingent of volunteers to Ferdinand's assistance—as long as it is understood by all concerned that their mission is unofficial and will receive no direct support from the Sicilian monarch. This is Roberto's way of ridding his kingdom of troublesome malcontents, especially Bertoldo.

The play's second scene introduces Camiola, the title character. Her "beauty, youth, and fortune" make her the target of several suitors, including: Signior Sylli, a ridiculously vain "self-lover;" Fulgentio, the corrupt and egomaniacal favourite of the king; Adorni, a retainer of Camiola's late father; and Bertoldo himself. Bertoldo is the man Camiola loves; but her high principles lead her to reject his suit. (They could only marry if Bertoldo obtained a dispensation from his vows as a member of a knightly monastic order—a course of action Camiola cannot approve.) After a touching farewell, Bertoldo leads his followers off to war.

The situation in Siena has gone badly for Ferdinand. Gonzaga's army is starving out the forces of Urbino, and can take the city at any time. His captains are eager for plunder, but the capable Gonzaga delays the final assault, since he expects a counter-attack. His expectation is fulfilled when Bertoldo and his forces arrive; but Gonzaga's troops have no trouble in defeating the new arrivals. (Many of Bertoldo's followers are effete courtiers inexperienced in combat—their antics provide some of the play's comedy.) The courtiers are ransomed from prison for two thousand crowns apiece; but Gonzaga is incensed that a member of his order has led the opposition, and sets Bertoldo's ransom at fifty thousand crowns. Roberto not only refuses to pay the ransom, but forbids any of his subjects to pay it either.

At home in Palermo, Camiola is oppressed by the arrogant attentions of Fulgentio. She refuses him, and when he slanders her in revenge, she protests to the King, leading to the favourite's disgrace. Bertoldo languishes in chains in a dungeon—but he is redeemed when Camiola pays his ransom. Roberto has decreed that no man among his subjects pay for Bertoldo's freedom; but Camiola is not a man. Bertoldo's difficulties have worked a change on Camiola's resolution. Her ransom comes with a price: Bertoldo signs a marriage contract to attain his freedom.

The ransom becomes moot, however, once Aurelia, the duchess of Siena, catches sight of Bertoldo. She falls in love with him instantly, and orders the ransom returned, much to Gonzaga's displeasure. The pair travels to Palermo, where the story comes to its climax. Camiola challenges the intended marriage of Bertoldo and Aurelia. But then she surprises everyone by rejecting Bertoldo and entering a nunnery; she distributes her fortune to worthy causes and asks Roberto to forgive Fulgentio and restore him to his place.

The play's overt comedy comes from several directions—Signior Sylli most notably, but also Fulgentio, the effete courtiers Antonio and Gasparo, and the soldiers of Gonzaga's army.

== Dramatic analysis ==
The play has been called "an improbable and escapist drama" comparable to Beaumont and Fletcher's A King and No King and other plays of its period. Other critics, though, have seen in the play the "un-Fletcherian moral earnestness" typical of Massinger. It has been argued that a passage in The Maid of Honour served as a source for "The Definition of Love," one of Andrew Marvell's most famous poems.

== See also ==
- Illegitimacy in fiction

== Sources ==
- Bland, D. S. "Marvell and Massinger." Review of English Studies Vol. 23 (1947).
- Campbell, Thomas. The Life of Mrs. Siddons. New York, Harper & Brothers, 1834.
- Foster, Verna A. The Name and Nature of Tragicomedy. London, Ashgate, 2004.
- Gifford, William, ed. The Plays of Philip Massinger. One-volume edition, New York, H. B. Mahn, 1857.
- Legouis, Peter. "Marvell and Massinger: A Source of 'The Definition of Love'." Review of English Studies Vol. 23 (1947).
- Logan, Terence P., and Denzell S. Smith, eds. The Later Jacobean and Caroline Dramatists: A Survey and Bibliography of Recent Studies in English Renaissance Drama. Lincoln, NE, University of Nebraska Press, 1978.
- Phelan, James. On Philip Massinger. Halle, E. Karras, 1878.
- Yamashita, Hiroshi. "The Printing of Philip Massinger's Plays," Shakespeare Studies (Tokyo), Vol. 10 (1971–72), pp. 16–38.
