= The Scornful Lady =

Jacobean era stage play by Francis Beaumont and John Fletcher

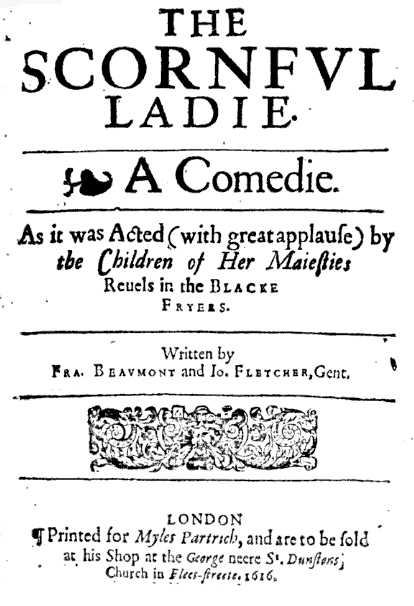
Title page of The Scornful Lady.

The Scornful Lady is a Jacobean era stage play, a comedy written by Francis Beaumont and John Fletcher, and first published in 1616, the year of Beaumont's death. It was one of the pair's most popular, often revived, and frequently reprinted works.

== Performances ==
The title page of the 1616 first edition states that the play was premiered by the Children of the Queen's Revels; it later passed into the possession of the King's Men, who revived the play in 1624. (The company's clown, John Shank, played the Curate in their 1624 production.) The King's Men acted The Scornful Lady on 19 October 1633, when Sir Henry Herbert, the Master of the Revels, refused to let them perform The Woman's Prize. Prince Charles, the future King Charles II, attended a performance of the play at the Cockpit-in-Court Theatre on Twelfth Night, 6 January 1642.

While the theatres were closed during the English Civil War and the Interregnum (1642–60), material was extracted from The Scornful Lady to form a droll called The False Heir and Formal Curate, published by Kirkman in The Wits.

The play was revived early in the Restoration and became a standard in the repertory. In his Diary, Samuel Pepys recorded seeing it on 27 November 1660 and on 4 January 1661, both times with male actors in the title role, as was standard up to that time. Then Thomas Killigrew staged the play with women in the female parts; Pepys saw that production on 12 February 1661. Pepys saw the play again on 27 December 1666, 16 September 1667, and 3 June 1668. Charles Hart and Edward Kynaston were among the actors of the day who played in it. The Scornful Lady remained in the repertory until the middle of the 18th century. Some early actresses acquired reputations for their work in the play; Anne Marshall was noted for her portrayal of the title character in the 1660s, while in the next century Mrs. Macklin, the wife of Charles Macklin, was a popular success as the servant Abigail.

== Authorship ==
The play was entered into the Stationers' Register on 19 March 1616; both the Register entry and the first edition assign the play to Beaumont and Fletcher. Cyrus Hoy, in his survey of authorship problems in the canon of Fletcher and his collaborators, produced this breakdown in the two writers' contributions:

Beaumont – Act I, scene 1; Act II, 2; Act V, 2;
Fletcher – Act I, scene 2; Act II, 2 and 3; Act III; Act IV; Act V, scenes 1, 3, and 4.

Hoy's schema is in general agreement with the work of earlier researchers. A few early critics suggested the participation of Philip Massinger, though that possibility has generally been rejected due to lack of evidence. Based on references and allusions to contemporary events, scholars generally date the play to the 1613–16 period, though dates as early as 1610 have also been proposed.

The Scornful Lady participates in a complex inter-relationship with several other plays of its era, a set of dramas that includes Marston's The Dutch Courtesan, Fletcher and Massinger's The Little French Lawyer, Massinger's The Parliament of Love, and A Cure for a Cuckold by John Webster and William Rowley. All the plays exploit the idea of a woman who wants her beloved to duel with and kill his closest friend.

== Texts ==
The play went through multiple editions in the 17th century, leaving it with a complex publication history.

- The 1616 first edition, published in quarto by the bookseller Miles Partridge, with the printing probably done by Richard Bradock.
- Q2, 1625, published by Thomas Jones, the printing presumably done by Augustine Matthews.
- Q3, 1630, issued again by Thomas Jones, printed by Bernard Alsop and Thomas Fawcett.
- Q4, 1635, published and printed by Augustine Matthews, the printer of Q2.
- Q5, 1639, issued by Robert Wilson, printing by Marmaduke Parsons.
- Q6, 1651, published by Humphrey Moseley; the printer was probably William Wilson.
- Two pirated editions of Moseley's Q6, issued by Francis Kirkman, both with the false date "1651."
- Q7, 1677, which, in light of the previous piracies, pointedly identifies itself as "The Seventh Edition" on its title page; "As it is now Acted at the Theatre Royal" in Drury Lane. The likely publishers were Thomas Collins and Dorman Newman, acting through the bookseller Simon Neale.
- Q8, 1691, from Dorman Newman.

Subsequent editions followed in the 18th century. Like other already-published Beaumont/Fletcher plays, The Scornful Lady was omitted from the first Beaumont and Fletcher folio of 1647, but was included in the second folio of 1679.

Thomas Shadwell borrowed from the Beaumont/Fletcher play for his own The Woman-Captain (1680), which was revived in 1744 as The Prodigal.
