= A Cure for a Cuckold =

Stage play by John Webster and William Rowley

A Cure for a Cuckold is a late Jacobean era stage play. It is a comedy written by John Webster and William Rowley. The play was first published in 1661, though it is understood to have been composed some four decades earlier.

== Date and performance ==
Hard-data on the play's actual date of origin is lacking. Scholars have generally assigned the play's creation to the 1624–25 period. The King's Men is generally assumed to be the first theatrical troupe to have performed it.

The play was later adapted by Joseph Harris into The City Bride (1696).

== Publication ==
In 1661 a quarto was printed by Thomas Johnson for the bookseller Francis Kirkman. Its title page assigns the play to Webster and Rowley. This quarto was the only edition of the play's publication printed before the nineteenth century.

== Authorship ==
Nineteenth-century scholars and critics (notably F. G. Fleay) disputed the attribution to Webster and Rowley but following the lead of Edmund Gosse most twentieth-century commentators have accepted the original authorial assignment, with Webster as the author of the serious main plot, and Rowley responsible for the comic subplot. Gosse, who admired the serious main plot, actually proposed splitting the play in two; and surprisingly enough this was later done – Webster's portion was published as a short play titled Love's Graduate in 1884. Gosse wasn't alone in his attitude; Algernon Charles Swinburne called the play "a mixture of coarsely realistic farce and gracefully romantic comedy."

In a 1927 study, Henry Gray posited Thomas Heywood as a third author. Gray argued that the play is mainly Rowley's work, with three scenes by Webster and four by Heywood. Webster may have revised the whole, in Gray's view. Gray's hypothesis has not found widespread support, though F. L. Lucas allowed a possibility that Heywood may have revised an original Webster/Rowley collaboration. Webster appears to have handled the play's main plot, and Rowley (unsurprisingly for a professional clown) the comic subplot.

== Influences ==
A Cure for a Cuckold shares a complex inter-relationship with a set of other plays of its era, including Marston's The Dutch Courtesan, Beaumont and Fletcher's The Scornful Lady, Fletcher and Massinger's The Little French Lawyer, and Massinger's The Parliament of Love. Since A Cure for a Cuckold is later than most, perhaps all, of these plays, it likely represents the cumulative influence of a skein of dramatic development winding through them, centring on the plot of a woman who wants her lover to duel with and kill his best friend.

== Synopsis ==
The house of Woodroff, an English merchant and justice of the peace, is celebrating the wedding of Woodroff's daughter Annabel with her suitor Bonvile. Two of the wedding guests, Lessingham and Clare, open the play in conversation about the wedding. Lessingham, who is in love with Clare, tries to use the occasion to further his own suit; but Clare is withdrawn and taciturn. She leaves him alone, then sends him a curt and cryptic message that reads:

Prove all thy friends, find out the best and nearest;
Kill for my sake the friend that loves thee dearest.

Lessingham is appalled at this but his passion for Clare is so intense that he feels compelled to obey Clare's dictates to win her love. When other wedding guests and friends reproach Lessingham for his preoccupation, he confesses that he needs a friend to second him in a duel – a friend who will not only support him morally, but fight and perhaps die with him. Lessingham's professed friends quickly drop away with a variety of excuses, till only one is left: it is Bonvile, the groom. Without hesitation, Bonvile delays his wedding night to accompany Lessingham to the "field of honor" – so proving himself to be the "best and nearest" friend whom Lessingham must kill.

Since duelling is illegal in England, Lessingham and Bonvile leave immediately for Calais, as was customary at the time. Annabel is distressed to find that her groom has left without a word; she sends a servant after him, and then follows herself. In the nearby woods, Rochfield, a younger son left destitute by the strictures of primogeniture, has decided to turn thief; he encounters Annabel, his first intended victim, and tries to rob her of her wedding necklace and bracelets. These, however, are locked onto her; as he fumbles with them in trying to remove them, Annabel grabs his sword. Yet because he is a gentlemanly thief who does not threaten her virtue, she returns his sword and promises to give him the monetary value of her jewellery, if he returns with her to her house. Since his career as a thief is not going well, Rochfield agrees.

True to her word, Annabel gives Rochfield twenty gold pieces, and introduces him as a friend of the groom. Justice Woodroff is gathering investors for a trading voyage that he's planning, and Annabel manoeuvres Rochfield into investing his twenty gold pieces in the venture. Broke again and having nothing to lose, Rochfield enlists in the venture personally. The voyage turns out to be brief but eventful: when not long out of port, the ship is attacked by "three Spanish men-of-war." The captain and master are killed – but Rochfield takes command and leads the crew in an effective resistance they even capture one of the Spanish ships, and return to England with a lucrative prize. From a desperate would-be thief, Rochfield has suddenly become a hero flush with new wealth.

On the beach at Calais, Lessingham reveals that Bonvile is his intended opponent. First surprised, then angered, Bonvile dismisses Lessingham's friendship; he suggests that Lessingham may want Annabel for himself, this being his true motive for the duel. This break in their friendship paradoxically negates the premise of the duel. Rather than fighting to the death as friends, the two men return to England separately, as enemies.

When Lessingham confronts Clare again, she tells him that he has completely misunderstood her meaning. Clare confesses that she was madly and hopelessly in love with Bonvile; with his marriage, she was deeply despondent. Clare had thought that Lessingham would recognise her, Clare, and his dearest friend, and therefore his correct victim. Once the five passionate young people, Annabel, Bonvile, Clare, Lessingham, and Rochfield, are all under the same roof, they involve themselves in a tangle of misunderstandings and jealousies – until wise old Woodroff manages to get them altogether and straighten them out at the end of the play.

In the subplot, a sailor named Compass returns home after four years at sea – to find that his wife Urse, believing him dead, has borne an illegitimate child, a son now a year old. Compass not only forgives her, but wants to be acknowledged as the child's father. In Compass's laissez-faire attitude, the true father has actually done the sailor a service in begetting him a child. This brings Compass into conflict with the boy's biological father, a merchant named Franckford. (Franckford is Woodroff's brother-in-law, and the link between the two plots.) Since Franckford's marriage (with Woodroff's sister Luce) is barren, Urse's baby is his only heir. Franckford has been paying the costs of the child's upkeep, and insists on his parental rights. The two men almost go to law over the issue (allowing for some satire on lawyers in the process), before Justice Woodroff, in a sort of mock-trial in a tavern, rules that the baby does not belong to either of the men, but to Urse, his mother. Compass and Urse renew their vows in the final scene, to make a new start as a family.

The easy amorality of the subplot distressed Victorian critics such as Swinburne and Gosse. Modern readers may tend to take the opposite approach, and judge the main plot's ethic of chastity, honour, and duelling far less humane and palatable than Compass's live-and-let-live ethos.
