= The Great Duke of Florence =

Stage play by Philip Massinger

The Great Dvke of Florence. A Comicall Historie. As It hath beene often Presented with Good Allowance by Her Ma^{ties} Servants at the Phœnix in Drurie Lane.
- Author: Philip Massinger
- Language: English
- Genre: Early Caroline era play; tragicomedy
- Publisher: Printed [by Miles Flesher] for John Marriot
- Publication date: 1636
- Publication place: London, England
- Media type: Print (hardcover)
- Pages: unpaginated (85 leaves)
- OCLC: 1190945087

The Great Duke of Florence is an early Caroline era stage play, a tragicomedy written by Philip Massinger, and first published in 1636. It has been called "one of Massinger's best dramas," and "a masterpiece of dramatic construction."

A play titled The Great Duke was licensed for performance by Sir Henry Herbert, the Master of the Revels, on 5 July 1627; the scholarly consensus interprets this as referring to Massinger's play. Topical allusions in the text have been read as indicating a date of authorship between October 1623 and March 1625. The play was acted by Queen Henrietta's Men at the Cockpit Theatre, and was published in quarto in 1636 by the bookseller John Marriot; Massinger dedicated the work to one of his patrons, Sir Robert Wiseman, in gratitude for his "supportment and protection." The quarto includes two commendatory poems, one by John Ford.

Massinger is thought to have based his plot on the traditional story of Ethelwald and Elfrida, available to him in several versions; he may also have been influenced by an earlier play, A Knack to Know a Knave.

The play had no other publications or revival productions in its own era or in subsequent generations—somewhat surprisingly, since critics have tended to regard it highly. Algernon Charles Swinburne called it "remarkable even among Massinger's works for elegance and grace of execution;" William Gifford, in his edition of Massinger's works, wrote that "It is impossible not to be charmed with the manner in which this play is written." In the play, Massinger exploits the richness of a courtly style, full of "gay flourishes of language" (Act IV, scene ii), perhaps more successfully than in any other of his works. Though generally classified as a tragicomedy, there is nothing tragic and little serious in it; the play can just as correctly be called a comedy of manners.

== Synopsis ==
Massinger based the play's titular character on Cosimo I de' Medici, Grand Duke of Tuscany, though in a loose and ahistorical manner. In the play, Duke "Cozimo" is a childless widower who intends to leave his dukedom to his nephew Giovanni, the son of his late sister. (The actual Cosimo I had eleven children, including one named Giovanni; and there are several other Giovanni de' Medicis is the historical record.) At the start of the play, Cozimo's nephew and heir Giovanni has spent several years living at the country house of his tutor, Carolo Charomonte, where he has pursued academic subjects as well as all the training suitable for a youth of his social position—music, horsemanship, swordsmanship and the like. He has also nourished a close friendship with Charomonte's young daughter and only child Lidia, who is a paragon of female virtues—beautiful, intelligent, chaste, and modest.

Now, however, Giovanni has been called back to the Duke's court; he takes a sad leave of his tutor and Lidia and travels to Florence with his servant Calandrino. The court is abuzz with the praises of Cozimo's favorite Count Sanazarro, who has just won a naval victory over the Ottoman fleet, the most recent of Sanazarro's many triumphs and distinctions. Sanazarro is specially favored by Cozimo's ward Fiorinda, who when she reaches her maturity will be the duchess of Urbino; Fiorinda goes so far as to give Sanazarro a diamond ring as a token of her regard. When Giovanni arrives, he requests that Fiorinda seek the Duke's permission to bring Lidia to court as one of her ladies in waiting. Other courtiers praise Lidia to the Duke; and Cozimo suspects that there may be a romantic connection between Giovanni and Lidia. This is not to his liking; the hint is that Cozimo may be planning a dynastic marriage between Giovanni and Fiorinda. Cozimo sends Sanazarro to Charomonte's country house to evaluate the young woman who may complicate his plans. Sanazarro meets Lidia—and instantly falls in love with her.

This is problematical, however; Sanazarro suspects that Cozimo is curious about Lidia because the Duke is thinking of marrying the girl himself. Back in Florence, Sanazarro shares his fears with Giovanni; neither of the young men welcomes the prospect of Cozimo marrying Lidia—and together they decide to mislead the Duke and dispraise Lidia to Cozimo. No sooner are they done running her down, however, than Fiorinda seeks out the Duke to fulfill her promise to Giovanni: she solicits permission to bring Lidia to the court, and in the process repeats all of Giovanni's lush praise of her. Cozimo is irate at the young men's patent attempt at manipulation; he decides to meet Lidia in person.

Cozimo travels to Charomonte's house with his courtiers, including Giovanni and Sanazarro; the increasingly desperate young men try to pass off a drunken serving woman as Lidia, and the Duke is temporarily fooled...only to become suspicious again after conversing with Charomonte. He meets Lidia himself, and realizes the hoodwinking that his heir and his favorite have tried to put over on him. They are quickly arrested and locked away in Charomonte's custody.

Sanazarro, shocked at his sudden fall, obtains a loose pane of glass from a window and inscribes a plea for Fiorinda's help on it, using the diamond ring she gave him; he manages to drop the glass message so that she finds it. In the closing scene's climactic confrontation, the young men express their regret at their deception and the young women plead for the Duke's forgiveness. Cozimo is reminded of his private vow to live in single widowerhood after the death of his beloved duchess; and he forgives the young men and allows the marriages of Giovanni with Lidia and Sanazarro with Fiorinda.

The play's quotient of broad comedy is supplied by Giovanni's servant Calandrino and the servants of Charomonte's household.

== Sources ==
- Adams, William Davenport. A Dictionary of the Drama. Philadelphia, J. B. Lippincott, 1904.
- Clark, Ira. The Moral Art of Philip Massinger. Lewisburg, PA, Bucknell University Press, 1993.
- Garrett, Martin. Massinger: The Critical Heritage. London, Routledge, 1991.
- Logan, Terence P., and Denzell S. Smith, eds. The Later Jacobean and Caroline Dramatists: A Survey and Bibliography of Recent Studies in English Renaissance Drama. Lincoln, NE, University of Nebraska Press, 1978.
- Patterson, Richard Ferrar. The Story of English Literature. New York, Philosophical Library, 1947.
- Ward, Adolphus William. A History of English Dramatic Literature to the Death of Queen Anne. London, Macmillan, 1875.
