= Paris (actor under Domitian) =

Paris was an actor in Rome in the 1st century AD.

Born in Egypt, he came to Rome in the reign of Domitian, where his skills as a pantomimus won him popular favour, noblewomen as lovers, influence within the imperial court and the power to promote his favourites within the court. That influence would seem to be demonstrated by the story of Juvenal's banishment to Egypt for attacking Paris.

His affair with Domitian's wife Domitia Longina led Domitian to divorce her and murder Paris, and even to kill one of Paris' pupils merely for looking like Paris and ordinary people for mourning Paris' death by placing flowers and perfumes on the site where he was murdered.

Martial composed Epigram xi.13 in Paris' honour, calling him sales Nili (wit of the Nile) and Romani decus et dolor theatri (ornament and grief of the Roman theatre-world). He is also recorded in Juv. vi.82-87 and was the subject of Philip Massinger's play The Roman Actor.
