= Rollo Duke of Normandy =

Play by John Fletcher, Philip Massinger, Ben Jonson and George Chapman

Rollo Duke of Normandy, also known as The Bloody Brother, is a play written in collaboration by John Fletcher, Philip Massinger, Ben Jonson and George Chapman. The title character is the historical Viking duke of Normandy, Rollo (lived 846 – c. 931). Scholars have disputed almost everything about the play; but it was probably written sometime in the 1612–24 era and later revised, perhaps in 1630 or after. In addition to the four writers cited above, the names of Nathan Field and Robert Daborne have been connected with the play by individual scholars.

== Synopsis ==
Rollo, Duke of Normandy, is locked in a struggle for power with his brother Otto. Urged on by the sycophantic LaTorch, Rollo eventually murders Otto.

After he commits a number of other bloodthirsty deeds, Rollo is lured into a private meeting with the beautiful Edith, daughter of one of his victims, who plots to murder him. As Edith hesitates, Hamond, captain of the guard and brother of another of Rollo's victims, breaks in and murders Rollo. Hamond is himself killed in the process.

Aubrey, Rollo's cousin, succeeds to the dukedom; he has Edith cloistered and LaTorch whipped and hanged.

== Performance and publication ==
Details of the play's earliest productions are not preserved in the historical record. The play was seen at the Globe Theatre on 13 May 1633, and was acted at Hampton Court Palace on 24 January 1637 (new style). It was entered into the Stationers' Register on 4 October 1639 by the booksellers John Crook and Richard Sergier, as the work of "J. B." It was first published later in 1639, in a quarto printed by R. Bishop for John Crook and Thomas Allot, under the title The Bloody Brother. The title page of this quarto attributes the play to "B. J. F." A second quarto appeared in 1640 under the title The Tragoedy of Rollo Duke of Normandy, published at Oxford by stationer Leonard Lichfield, "Printer to the University." Q2 assigns the play to Fletcher, and asserts that it was acted by the King's Men. Q2 appears to derive from a theatre prompt-book, while Q1 shows less sign of direct contact with the stage and is a more "literary" text. The play was included in the second Beaumont and Fletcher folio of 1679.

Though the theatres were officially closed from 1642 to 1660, surreptitious performances occurred sporadically through the era. 1647 was a year of relative official lenience, when the actors were surprisingly active; but the London authorities soon cracked down. On 5 February 1648, King's Men players were arrested in the midst of a clandestine performance of Rollo at the Cockpit Theatre. Joseph Taylor was acting Rollo; John Lowin played Aubrey, Charles Hart Otto; Nicholas Burt was Latorch, and Thomas Pollard the Cook. The actors were arrested, and imprisoned in Hatton House for a time; their costumes were confiscated.

== Authorship ==
Scholars have been divided about the nature of the play's authorship. Some have regarded it as a play that was originally written by Jonson and Chapman and later revised by Fletcher and Massinger; while this scheme makes a good deal of sense, others have disputed it. In his sweeping study of authorship problems in the Fletcher canon, Cyrus Hoy provided this breakdown among the shares of the four dramatists —

Massinger — Act I; Act V, scene 1 (lines 1–90);
Massinger and Fletcher —Act V, 1 (remainder) and 2 (first part);
Fletcher — Act II; Act III, 1 (middle portion) and 2; Act V, 2 (second part);
Chapman — Act III, 1 (excluding middle portion); Act IV, 3;
Jonson — Act IV, 1–2.
