= John Warburton (officer of arms) =

English antiquarian, cartographer and officer of arms (1682–1759)

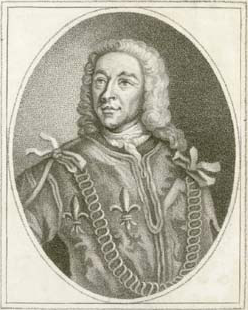

John Warburton (1682–1759) was an antiquarian, cartographer, and Somerset Herald of Arms in Ordinary at the College of Arms in the early 18th century.

== Life ==
Warburton was the son of Benjamin and Mary Warburton. In his youth, John was an exciseman and then a supervisor, being stationed from 1718–19 at Bedale in Yorkshire. He was admitted as a Fellow of the Royal Society in March 1719, but was ejected on 9 June 1757 for nonpayment of his subscription. His election as Fellow of the Society of Antiquaries of London took place on 13 January 1720, but he ceased to be a member at some point before January 1754. On 18 June 1720, he was appointed to the office of Somerset Herald in the College of Arms.

Warburton's first wife was named Dorothy, but they separated in 1716. He later married a widow with children. He had a son called John by his second wife, and is said to have married her minor son to one of his own daughters. The younger John, 1732–about 1798, was an attorney who married a woman named Ann Catherine Mores in 1756. Warburton's only daughter, Amelia, 1735–1786, married a man named John Elphinstone.

Warburton died at his apartments in the College of Arms, London, his usual place of residence, on 11 May 1759. He was buried in the south aisle of St Benet's, Paul's Wharf, London.

== Works ==
Warburton published in 1716 from his surveying a map of the county of Northumberland in four sheets, and during the next few years produced similar maps of the counties of Yorkshire, Middlesex, Essex, and Hertfordshire.

Warburton produced in 1749 a "Map of Middlesex" in two sheets of imperial atlas, which came under the censure of John Anstis the Younger. Warburton had given on the border of the map five hundred engraved arms, and the Earl Marshal, supposing many of them to be fictitious, ordered that no copies should be sold until the right to wear them had been proved. Warburton endeavoured to vindicate himself in London and Middlesex illustrated by Names, Residence, Genealogy, and Coat-armour of the Nobility, Merchants, &c. (1749).

In 1753, Warburton published Vallum Romanum, or the History and Antiquities of the Roman Wall in Cumberland and Northumberland, the survey and plan of which he had made in 1715. Historian William Hutton applauded him as "the judicious Warburton, whom I regard for his veracity".

John Nichols printed in 1779 in two volumes from the collections of Warburton and antiquary Andrew Ducarel Some Account of the Alien Priories, but the compilers' names were not mentioned. This omission was rectified in many copies issued in 1786 with a new title page.

== Collections ==
Warburton was an avid collector of old books and manuscripts, but often careless. After much drinking and attempting to "muddle" Humfrey Wanley, he sold in July 1720 to the Earl of Oxford many valuable manuscripts on Wanley's own terms. On another occasion, he left a pile of drama manuscripts in the kitchen. When he came looking for them a year later, nearly all were gone because his cook, Betsy Baker, had used over fifty of the manuscripts as scrap paper while cooking—either for lighting fires or for lining the bottoms of pie pans while baking pies.

Notwithstanding his carelessness, Warburton left behind him a huge collection of books, manuscripts, and prints, which were sold by auction in 1766. Many of his topographical manuscripts are in the Lansdowne collection at the British Museum.

=== A complete list of the destroyed play manuscripts ===
- Alexias, or The Chaste Gallant, a tragedy by Philip Massinger; it was licensed for performance by the King's Men on 25 September 1639.
- Antonio and Vallia, attributed to Philip Massinger; it's possible this was identical to or a revision of a play of the same name performed by Philip Henslowe's company in 1595.
- Beauty in a Trance, by John Ford; it was performed by the King's Men on 28 November 1630.
- Believe as You List, a comedy by Philip Massinger. It was licensed for performance by the King's Men on 6 May 1631, four months after the Master of the Revels refused to approve it because of "dangerous matter" in it about "the deposing of Sebastian king of Portugal by Philip the [Second,] and there being a peace sworn twixt the kings of England and Spain."
- The City Shuffler, no author named, or part specified; records indicate that The City Shuffler, part 2 was licensed for performance by the Salisbury Court company in October 1633 after a Mr. Sewster removed his objections to it, presumably because it had once contained some kind of personal satire.
- The Crafty Merchant, attributed to Shackerley Marmion; it was licensed for performance by the Lady Elizabeth's Men at the Red Bull Theatre on 12 September 1623, although that document ascribes the authorship to William Bonen.
- The Duchess of Fernandina, a tragedy by Henry Glapthorne.
- Duke Humphrey, attributed to William Shakespeare.
- The Fair Favorite, by William Davenant. It was licensed for performance on 17 November 1638, and belonged to the King's Men.
- The Fairy Queen, no author given.
- Fast and Welcome, a comedy by Philip Massinger.
- The Fatal Love, no author given; a 1660 Stationers' Register entry claims the play was "a French tragedy" (meaning set in France) written by George Chapman.
- The Flying Voice, by Ralph Wood.
- The Forced Lady, a tragedy by Philip Massinger; a record dated 7 August 1641 identifies it as a King's Men play.
- The Governor, a tragedy by Sir Cornelius Formido. It was acted by the King's Men at court on 17 February 1637.
- The Great Man, a tragedy, no author given.
- Henry I, attributed to William Shakespeare and Robert Davenport; it was licensed for performance by the King's Men on 10 April 1624, but in that record assigned only to Davenport.
- The History of Job, by Robert Greene.
- The Honorable Loves, a comedy by William Rowley.
- The Honor of Women, a comedy by Philip Massinger; it was licensed for performance on 6 May 1628.
- An Ill Beginning Has a Good End is the 1660 Stationers' Register reading for a play Warburton listed as A Good Beginning May Have a Good End; both records ascribe it to John Ford. It is presumed to be the same as A Bad Beginning Makes a Good Ending, performed by the King's Men at court during the winter of 1612–13.
- The Inconstant Lady, a play by Arthur Wilson (Warburton mistakenly gives the first name as "William"); it was presented at court by the King's Men on 30 September 1630.
- An Interlude, by Ralph Wood, which Warburton said was "worth nothing;" "interlude" may have been a description rather than the title.
- Jocondo and Astolfo, a comedy by Thomas Dekker.
- The Judge, a comedy by Philip Massinger; it was licensed for performance by the King's Men on 6 June 1627.
- The King of Swedeland, no author given; a 1660 Stationers Register entry identified the king as Gustavus and the play's author as Thomas Dekker.
- The London Merchant, a comedy by John Ford.
- Love Hath Found His Eyes, by Thomas Jordan.
- The Lovers of Ludgate, no author given.
- The Maiden's Holiday, attributed to Christopher Marlowe; a 1654 entry in the Stationers' Register says it was a collaboration between Marlowe and John Day.
- A Mask, attributed to "R. Govell," otherwise unknown; possibly the same as The Mask, which was licensed for performance by the Palsgrave's Company on 3 November 1624, with no author listed. Records show that Richard Gunnell was writing for the company at the time, and G.E. Bentley notes that "'R. Govell' would be an easy misreading of 'R. Gonell' or 'R. Gunell'; no other early-seventeenth century dramatist has a name so similar."
- Minerva's Sacrifice, a play by Philip Massinger; it was licensed for performance by the King's Men on 3 November 1629.
- The Noble Choice, a tragicomedy by Philip Massinger.
- The Noble Trial, a tragedy by Henry Glapthorne; the 1660 Stationers Register entry describes it as a tragicomedy.
- The Nobleman, a tragicomedy by Cyril Tourneur. It was performed by the King's Men at court on 23 February 1612.
- The Nonesuch, a comedy by William Rowley.
- Nothing Impossible to Love, a tragicomedy by Sir Robert Le Grys.
- Orpheus, a comedy, no author given.
- The Parliament of Love, attributed to William Rowley; it was licensed for performance on 3 November 1624, but there ascribed to Philip Massinger. The play is still extant through another source, and Massinger's sole authorship is generally accepted.
- Philenzo and Hippolito, a comedy by Philip Massinger; a 1660 Stationers Register entry characterizes it as a tragicomedy. An anonymous play of the same title belonged to Philip Henslowe's company and was performed in 1594, but it is unknown what relation, if any, it had to the play in Warburton's hands.
- The Puritan Maid, the Modest Wife, and the Wanton Widow, attributed to Thomas Middleton.
- The Royal Combat, a comedy by John Ford.
- Saint George for England, a play by William Smith.
- The Spanish Purchase, a comedy, no author given. It was licensed for performance by the Salisbury Court company in 1639.
- 'Tis Good Sleeping in a Whole Skin, attributed to W. Wager.
- The Tragedy of Job. Possibly the same as The History of Job, which Warburton assigned to Robert Greene. Alongside the entry Warburton wrote "Good," either his opinion of the play or who he thought was the author (no playwright named Good is known to have written for the English Renaissance stage).
- The Tyrant, a tragedy by Philip Massinger.
- The Vestal, a tragedy by Henry Glapthorne. Warburton lists it twice, either in error or because he had two manuscripts.
- The Widow's Prize, a comedy by William Sampson; licensed for performance by Prince Charles' Men on 25 January 1625.
- The Woman's Plot, a comedy by Philip Massinger; it was performed at court by the King's Men on 5 November 1621.
- A Yorkshire Gentlewoman and Her Son, a tragedy with no author named; a 1660 Stationers Register entry assigns it to George Chapman.

In addition, "A Play by William Shakespeare" (with no elaboration given) was also lost, as well as a copy of Sir John Suckling's "Works," possibly a printed edition.

=== Survivals ===
Warburton listed only three plays which escaped destruction: The Second Maiden's Tragedy (which he assigned to George Chapman, but now usually considered by scholars to be the work of Thomas Middleton), The Queen of Corsica (a tragedy by Francis Jaques), and The Bugbears (a comedy by John Jeffere).

Not every play destroyed by Warburton's cook was irretrievably lost. Five of them have been preserved through separate sources. These include Believe as You List, The Fair Favorite, The Governor, The Inconstant Lady, and The Parliament of Love. The prologue and epilogue to Thomas Jordan's Love Hath Found His Eyes are also still extant, published in Jordan's poetry collection Royal Arbor of Loyal Poesy (1663). It is possible that a few of the remaining plays have also been preserved, under different titles; Shakespeare's Duke Humphrey, for example, may have been a version of Henry VI, part 2, in which Humphrey plays a major part.

== See also ==
- Cardenio
- Philip Massinger
- Cyril Tourneur
- Carlyle's The French Revolution
