= The Duke of Milan =

Stage play by Philip Massinger

The Duke of Millaine. A Tragædie. As It hath beene often Acted by His Maiesties Seruants, at the Blacke Friers.
- Author: Philip Massinger
- Language: English
- Publisher: Prin[t]ed by B[ernard] A[lsop] for Edward Blackmore, and are to be sold at his shop at the great south doore of Pauls
- Publication date: 1623
- Publication place: London
- Media type: Print (hardcover)
- Pages: 91
- OCLC: 84759975

The Duke of Milan is a Jacobean era stage play, a tragedy written by Philip Massinger. First published in 1623, the play is generally considered among the author's finest achievements in drama.

== Performance ==
Massinger's play was first performed between 1621 and 1623; an apparent allusion to the imprisonment of the poet George Wither in Act III, scene 2 makes sense at that point in time.

There is no record of a revival of The Duke of Milan during the Restoration era. A heavily adapted version by Richard Cumberland was staged at Covent Garden in 1779, but lasted only three performances. Massinger's original was revived by Edmund Kean at Theatre Royal, Drury Lane in 1816; Kean hoped to repeat his sensational success as Sir Giles Over-reach in A New Way to Pay Old Debts, another Massinger play. Kean, however, was not able to achieve the same result with The Duke of Milan.

== Publication ==
The play was first published in quarto by the stationer Edward Blackmore in 1623. Blackmore had entered the play in the Stationers' Register with George Norton on 20 January that year as "A play called Sforza, Duke of Millaine, made by M^{r}. Messenger." Massinger furnished the first edition with a dedication to Katherine Stanhope (c. 1595–1636), the wife of Philip, Lord Stanhope (then Baron of Shelford and future Earl of Chester), a cousin of Mary Sidney, Countess of Pembroke, and a sister of Henry Hastings, 5th Earl of Huntingdon, who was the primary patron of Massinger's longtime collaborator John Fletcher. (Massinger also dedicated his poem A New Year's Gift to her.) The 1623 quarto also included a commendatory poem signed by "W. B." A second quarto of the play appeared in 1638.

== Sources ==
The play is loosely based on historical events in northern Italy c. 1525, during the Italian wars of Francis I of France versus Charles V, Holy Roman Emperor and King of Spain—though Massinger makes no attempt at, and maintains no pretense of, strict historical accuracy. His protagonist, the "supposed Duke of Milan," is called Ludovico Sforza, though the historical figure of that name predeceased the events of the play by a generation; Massinger conflates him with his son and successor, Francesco Sforza. Massinger's sources for Italian history in the relevant era were William Thomas's The History of Italy (1561) and Francesco Guicciardini's Historia d'Italia, most probably in Geoffrey Fenton's translation (third edition, 1618). The plot of the play actually derives from ancient history, specifically the story of Herod the Great as recorded in The Jewish War and Jewish Antiquities by the historian Josephus (which Massinger most likely knew in Thomas Lodge's 1602 translations).

The Duke of Milan also shows a strong debt to Shakespeare's Othello, for its general plot of a man betrayed by unreasoning jealousy into suspecting his innocent wife and so destroying himself. (Othello was first printed in 1622.) The concluding plot device of the corpse's poisoned kiss derives from two earlier plays, The Revenger's Tragedy (1606) and The Second Maiden's Tragedy (1611), both probably the work of Thomas Middleton.

== Synopsis ==
Ludovico Sforza, Duke of Venice, is a forceful and formidable ruler, whose "whole life hath been / But one continu'd pilgrimage through dangers, / Affrights, and horrors...." He has one controlling passion—his overwhelming, uxorious obsession with his wife Marcelia. He treats her with little less than idolatry; and she is affected by his extravagant praises. As one Milanese courtier observes,

...when beauty is

Stamp'd on great women, great in birth, and fortune,
And blown by flatterers greater than it is,
'Tis seldom unaccompanied with pride;
Nor is she that way free.

The duke's mother Isabella and his sister Mariana are especially resentful of Marcelia's dominance at the court; but they have small recourse to remedy their unhappiness.

Sforza receives unwelcome news: the French troops of Francis I have been defeated at the Battle of Pavia by the Spanish armies of Charles V. Since Sforza is an ally of the French, his position is now critical. His friend the Marquis of Pescara comes to counsel him; Pescara recommends that Sforza go directly to the Emperor and make his submission, rather than wait for Spanish troops to show up on his border. Sforza takes his friend's advice. Just before he hurries away, however, he gives a special instruction to his favourite and brother-in-law Francisco; if he, Sforza, does not return alive from the Emperor's camp, Francisco must kill Marcelia. Sforza cannot stand the thought of her ever marrying another man.

Sforza goes to confront the Emperor; he behaves with dignity and sincerity, explaining that he maintained his allegiance to the French king out of loyalty for Francis's past support. In honour, he could do nothing else. Charles admires Sforza's forthright manner, and confirms Sforza as Duke of Milan; even Charles's mercenaries are impressed with the Duke...and with the payment he makes to them. Sforza quickly returns to Milan and Marcelia.

In his absence, however, Francisco has made sexual advances to Marcelia; when she rebuffs him, he shows her Sforza's written order for her death. Marcelia is deeply offended by this. Francisco palliates Marcelia with an abject apology; when Sforza returns, Marcelia does not inform on the favourite's conduct—but she is notably cool to Sforza, much to his shock and distress. The malicious Mariana and Isabella use this situation to cause dissension, spreading word that Marcelia is unfaithful with Francisco. Sforza rejects the idea; but Francisco, acting on his own motives for revenge, tells the Duke that Marcelia has propositioned him. Enraged, Sforza stabs Marcelia. With her dying breath, Marcelia tells her husband the truth. Francisco flees from the court, confirming his guilt. Sforza is in a "frenzy" of grief at what he has done. To keep the Duke from harming himself or others, the doctors of the court have to convince Sforza that his wife is not yet dead.

Francisco is shown with his sister Eugenia; their conversation reveals that Sforza had seduced Eugenia three years earlier, but then abandoned her when he met Marcelia. Francisco has been planning revenge for this affront ever since. His final act in this plan is to disguise himself as a travelling medical man—"A Jew by birth, and a physician"—who can cure the Duke's mental distraction. In this disguise, Francisco agrees to maintain the fiction that Marcelia is still alive; he paints her corpse with cosmetics, so cunningly that she appears to live again. Seeing the made-up body, Sforza kisses his late wife—and is poisoned by the toxic cosmetics. Francisco scorns the tortures that await him, and exults as Sforza dies.
