= The Emperor of the East =

Play by Philip Massinger

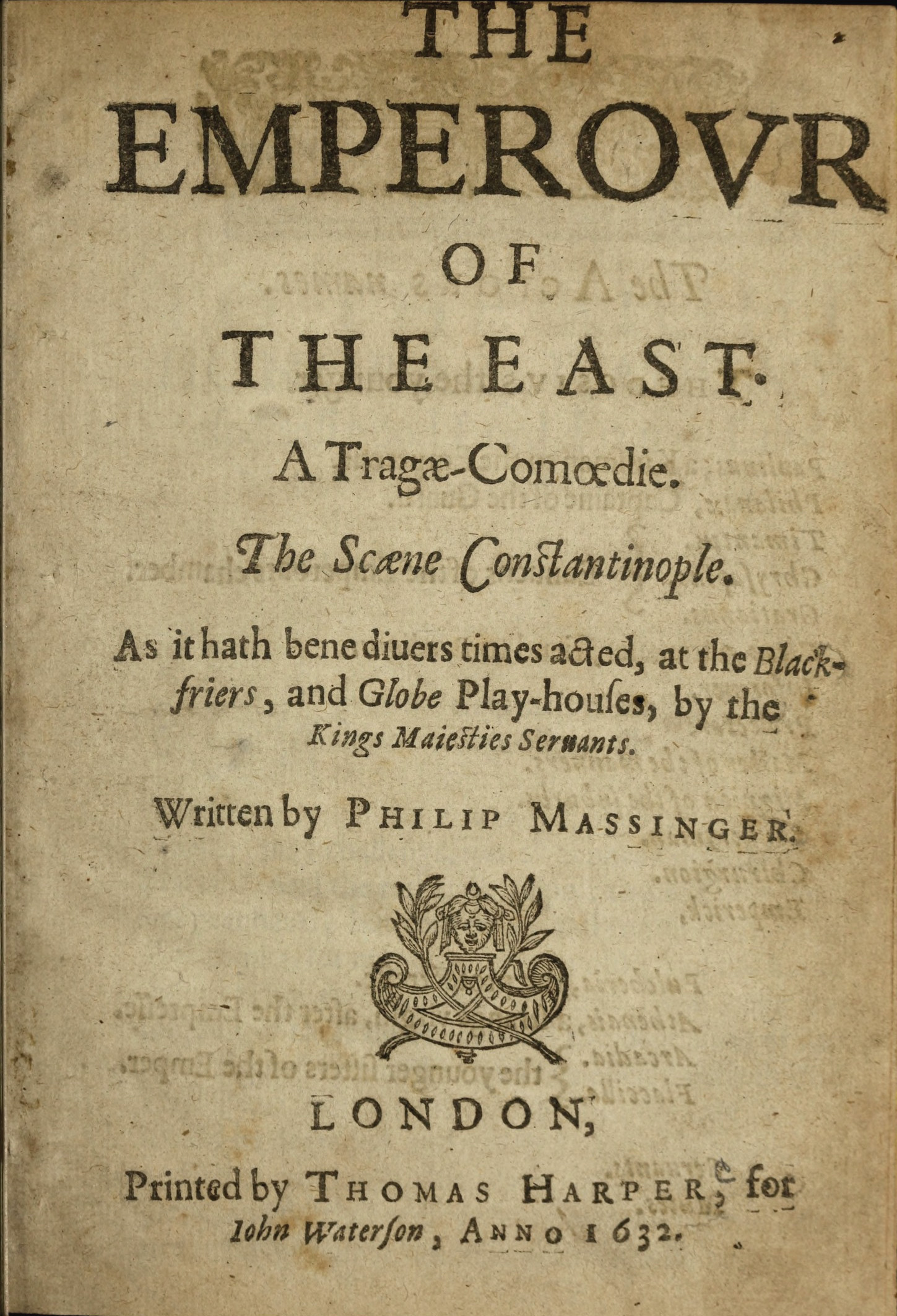
Title page of the first edition, 1632 (Boston Public Library)

The Emperor of the East is a Caroline era stage play, a tragicomedy written by Philip Massinger and first published in 1632. The play provides an interesting example of the treatment of the Roman Catholic sacrament of confession in English Renaissance theatre.

== Performance ==
The Emperor of the East was licensed for performance by Sir Henry Herbert, the Master of the Revels, on 11 March 1631. The play was performed by the King's Men at both of their theatres, the Blackfriars and the Globe; the company also acted the play at Court.

== Publication ==
The play was published in quarto in 1632, printed by Thomas Harper for the London bookseller John Waterson. Massinger dedicated the play to John Lord Mohun, Baron of Okehampton, one of his patrons. Mohun was the uncle of Massinger's friend Sir Aston Cockayne, who contributed a commendatory poem to the 1632 edition. Mohun was also the son-in-law of Lady Katherine Stanhope, to whom Massinger dedicated his play The Duke of Milan in 1623.

== Sources ==
Massinger's primary source for the historical background of his plot was Sir Thomas Hawkins's The Holy Court (1626), a translation of Nicholas Caussin's La cour sainte.

== The plot ==
In the play, Massinger dramatises the Byzantine Emperor Theodosius II, his elder sister and regent Pulcheria, and his wife and empress Eudocia; specifically, he deals with Eudocia's rumoured infidelity with the courtier Paulinus. Since the play is a tragicomedy and therefore concludes with a happy ending, Masssinger resolves his plot difficulties by having Theodosius masquerade as clergy and hear his wife's confession, which convinces him that she is innocent of infidelity. Given that Massinger was reputedly a Catholic, it might be considered surprising that he would exploit such a plot device; yet his contemporary dramatist James Shirley, another reputed Catholic, employs the same trick of clerical disguise and sacrament violation in his later play The Gentleman of Venice (1639).

The Emperor of the East is among the Massinger plays in which the influence of, and borrowing from, William Shakespeare is most abundant.
