= Zachary Crofton =

Anglo-Irish minister (1626-1672)

Zachary Crofton (1626–1672) was an Anglo-Irish nonconforming minister and controversialist, in England from the 1640s.

== Life ==
He was born in Ireland and principally educated at Dublin. He came to England about 1646. His first living was at Wrenbury in Cheshire, from which he was expelled in 1648 for refusing to take the engagement. He then came to London, and was for some time minister of St. James's, Garlick Hythe, and then obtained the rectory of St. Botolph, Aldgate. He held that position until the Restoration, when he was ejected for nonconformity. He was prosecuted (in some fashion) in 1657 for whipping his servant girl, Mary Cadman. The case became notorious, and the theme of a 1661 play The Presbyterian Lash, by Francis Kirkman. Crofton had defended himself in 1657 under the pseudonym Alethes Noctroff.

He has been called "the best known Presbyterian controversialist in the Restoration", and advanced a presbyterian position that was both royalist and anti-episcopal. He began a controversy with Bishop John Gauden respecting the solemn league and covenant, for the defence of which he was committed to the Tower of London. The date has been debated; he is recorded as sent to the Tower on 23 March 1661 (New Style). Daniel Neal's History of the Puritans states that this controversy took place before Crofton's ejectment, and that he was turned out of his parish despite his support for the Restoration. The arrest of Crofton came after mail was opened in a scare about presbyterian sentiment in the capital.

Crofton, with his wife and seven children, returned to Cheshire, where, after another short imprisonment, the cause of which is unknown, he supported himself by farming, or by keeping a grocer's shop. In 1667 he again came to London and opened a school near Aldgate. He died in 1672. He published a large number of pamphlets and tracts, mostly of a controversial character, and a few sermons.
