= The Bondman (play) =

Stage play by Philip Massinger

The Bondman is a later Jacobean-era stage play, a tragicomedy written by Philip Massinger, first published in 1624. The play has been called "the finest of the more serious tragicomedies" of Massinger.

== Performance and publication ==
The Bondman was licensed for performance by Sir Henry Herbert, the Master of the Revels, on 3 December 1623, as The Noble Bondman, and was acted by the Lady Elizabeth's Men at the Cockpit Theatre, and also performed for the Court at Whitehall Palace. The play was entered into the Stationers' Register on 12 March the following year, 1624, and published soon after in a quarto printed by Edward Allde for the booksellers John Harrison and Edward Blackmore. A second quarto appearing in 1638. Massinger dedicated the play to Philip Herbert, then the Earl of Montgomery and later Earl of Pembroke and Lord Chancellor. Massinger had an important and long-standing connection with the Herbert family through his father. (The play was a "modest success...in untying the purse strings of Philip Herbert" and winning Massinger some patronage support.)

The drama proved popular in its own era and long after. William Cartwright depended heavily upon it when writing his own drama The Royal Slave (1636). The Bondman was revived during the Restoration era; in the first years of the 1660s it was performed repeatedly by several companies, Killigrew's King's Company, Davenant's Duke's Company, John Rhodes's troupe, and perhaps George Jolly's too.

Samuel Pepys saw the play in 1661, and praised Thomas Betterton's performance as Pisander. Betterton played the role at Drury Lane as late as 1719. Richard Cumberland produced an adaptation that was staged at Covent Garden in 1769. Later, a segment of Act I, scene iii was abstracted for its patriotic message and distributed as a broadside prior to the expected invasion of Napoleon.

== Sources ==
The play tells the story of Timoleon and his defence of Syracuse against Carthage in 338 BC. Massinger's primary source for his plot was the treatment of Timoleon in the Parallel Lives of Plutarch, though he also drew upon works by Herodotus, Justin, and Seneca the Elder. Massinger's play includes an approving treatment of the assassination of Timoleon's older brother Timophanes for tyranny – surprising and noteworthy, given the absolutist political era in which the play appeared.

Critics have debated whether and to what degree Massinger's play was a commentary on the political climate of his own era, and its possible status as an intended work of propaganda.

== Synopsis ==
The play is set in ancient Syracuse (though in typical Jacobean manner, Massinger gives his characters contemporaneous dress and manners: the ancient Syracusans wear ruffs around their necks and behave like Jacobeans). On the eve of a Carthaginian invasion, the citizens of the city have invited Timoleon from Corinth to command their defensive effort. Timoleon is welcomed by prominent Syracusans, including Archidamus, his son Timagoras, and his daughter Cleora. Leosthenes, a friend of Timagoras, is Cleora's suitor (though not her only one).

In the play's early scenes, Massinger presents a picture of Syracuse as a deeply corrupt society. Cleon, a rich citizen, is a selfish glutton; the mature women are sexually rapacious, one even attempting to seduce her own stepson; and the city's slaves are badly abused. Members of the younger generation, however, are hungry for the reform that Timoleon's arrival promises. Leosthenes is a valiant but insecure and jealous young man; when he takes his leave of Cleora, he expresses his jealousy, and Cleora, resentful of his mistrust of her virtue, vows to wear a blindfold and to remain mute until Leosthenes returns from the war.

Timoleon organizes the citizens' military forces and marches them out of the city – and the city's slaves ready for revolt. They are led by Pisander, a gentleman from Thebes who is masquerading as Marullo, a slave in Archidamus's household. The ensuing slave revolt is managed by Pisander so that the citizens, while treated roughly, are not slaughtered; it turns out that Pisander's motive in starting the revolt is to further his own suit for Cleora's hand in marriage. Aided by Cleora's personal slave Timandra, Pisander pleads his suit to the blindfolded and mute Cleora, and so effectively that she is touched by his appeal.

The forces under Timoleon are victorious over the Carthaginians; but when they march home in triumph, they find the slaves in charge of the city and the gates closed against them. Their assault on the city fails, but when the slaves venture out to attack them, the masters manage to terrify the slaves with their whips and overcome the resistance. Once they retake the city, the Syracusans round up the rebellious slaves, including Pisander/Marullo, but Cleora causes a scandal by taking his part, against the vocal opposition of Leosthenes and Timagoras. In a trial before Timoleon, Cleora pleads her case, and Pisander reveals his true identity as a prominent, well-known, well-respected Theban noble; it is also revealed that Cleora's slave Timandra is actually Pisander's sister Statilia. Leosthenes had previously been engaged to marry Statilia, but had turned his back on her. In the play's denouement, Pisander and Cleora and Leosthenes and Statilia are united as couples, and the rebel slaves are re-absorbed into a more humanely ordered Syracusan society.
