= Joseph Taylor (actor) =

English actor

Joseph Taylor (died in 1652) was a 17th-century English actor. As the successor of Richard Burbage, who was the leading actor with the King's Men, he was arguably the most important actor in the later Jacobean and the Caroline eras.

== Early career ==
Taylor started as a child actor with the Children of the Chapel in the first decade of the century. As he matured he remained in the profession, with the Lady Elizabeth's Men and Prince Charles's Men. With those companies, he developed into an important leading man.

== King's men ==
Richard Burbage died in March 1619; Taylor joined the King's Men the next month, and over the coming years he acted all the major roles of the Shakespearean canon. According to James Wright's Historia Histrionica (1699), Taylor "acted Hamlet incomparably well" and was noted for his Iago. He was also famous for the parts of Paris in The Roman Actor (Philip Massinger), Ferdinand in The Duchess of Malfi (John Webster), and Mosca in Volpone, Face in The Alchemist, and Truewit in Epicene (all by Ben Jonson). Taylor starred in many King's men plays; he played the protagonists in Massinger's The Picture and Arthur Wilson's The Swisser; he was the Duke in Lodowick Carlell's The Deserving Favourite.

=== Leadership ===
Taylor and John Lowin became leaders of the King's Men after the deaths of Henry Condell (1627) and John Heminges (1630). At the same time (1630), Taylor gained a share in the Blackfriars Theatre, and two shares in the Globe. Together with Cuthbert Burbage, Richard Robinson and Winifred (d.1642), his wife, William Heminges, and John Lowin, Taylor filed a Bill of Complaint on 28 January 1632 in the Court of Requests against the owner of the Globe, Sir Matthew Brend, in order to obtain confirmation of an extension of the 31-year lease originally granted by Sir Matthew Brend's father, Nicholas Brend.

He was one of the King's Men who signed the dedication of the first Beaumont and Fletcher folio of 1647.

=== Commonwealth period ===
Taylor and other King's Men struggled during the Commonwealth period when the theatres were officially closed; they performed when and where they could. On 1 January 1649, Taylor, Lowin, and other company members were arrested while acting Rollo Duke of Normandy at the Cockpit Theatre. (Taylor played the title role.) They were incarcerated for a short time, then released.

In 1652 a special publication of John Fletcher's The Wild Goose Chase was issued; the proceeds went to Lowin and Taylor to relieve their financial need. Taylor and Lowin had played the roles of Belleur and Mirabel in the King's Men's production of the play. The Wild Goose Chase had been lost and was left out of the first Beaumont and Fletcher folio, then rediscovered and published.

The date of Taylor's death is not known with certainty, though he was buried on 4 November 1652.

== Cast lists ==
In the 25 cast lists that were added to the second Beaumont and Fletcher folio of 1679, Taylor is mentioned in 18, for the following plays:

- The Coxcomb
- The Custom of the Country
- The Double Marriage
- The False One
- The Honest Man's Fortune
- The Humorous Lieutenant
- The Island Princess
- The Laws of Candy
- The Little French Lawyer
- The Lovers' Progress
- The Maid in the Mill
- The Pilgrim
- The Prophetess
- The Sea Voyage
- The Spanish Curate
- The Wild Goose Chase
- A Wife for a Month
- Women Pleased

His total is second only to Lowin's 21. The lists for The Coxcomb and The Humorous Lieutenant refer to the companies to which Taylor belonged early in his career; the other 16 refer to the King's Men. On 11 of the lists, Taylor is mentioned first, an index of his standing as the company's leading player. (For comparison, Burbage is on seven of the lists, and always in first place.)
