= The Parliament of Love =

Play by Philip Massinger

The Parliament of Love is a late Jacobean era stage play, a comedy written by Philip Massinger. The play was never printed in the seventeenth century, and survived only in a defective manuscript – making it arguably the most problematical work in the Massinger canon.

The Parliament of Love was licensed for performance by Sir Henry Herbert, the Master of the Revels, on 3 November 1624. Herbert's entry indicates that the play was to be performed at the Cockpit Theatre. The play was entered into the Stationers' Register on 29 June 1660, but no publication ensued.

== The manuscript ==
A manuscript of the play was in the collection belonging to John Warburton that was destroyed by Warburton's cook; that manuscript reportedly attributed the play to William Rowley. Scholars who have studied the authorship question have generally dismissed the Rowley attribution; the play as it exists is widely assigned to Massinger alone. (It is possible, though perhaps unlikely, that there were two plays of the same name by the two different writers.)

The manuscript that did survive, written double-sided on nineteen folio leaves, eventually came into the possession of Edmond Malone, the prominent Shakespeare scholar of the later eighteenth and early nineteenth centuries. Malone made the manuscript available to William Gifford, who transcribed the text and included it in his collected edition of Massinger's works (1805–13).

== Dramatic relations ==
Critics have noted relationships between The Parliament of Love and other English Renaissance plays, including Marston's The Dutch Courtesan, the Beaumont and Fletcher play The Scornful Lady, and the Webster/Rowley collaboration A Cure for a Cuckold. Each of these plays exploits the idea of a woman who wants her suitor to kill his best friend in a duel.

== Synopsis ==
The play is set in France during the reign of Charles VIII (reigned 1483-1498); Massinger exploits Charles's actual reputation as a pleasure-loving and sybaritic monarch to create the mood for his romantic comedy. In the opening scene, the aristocratic heroine Bellisant is being reproved by her former guardian, a nobleman name Chamont. Since coming into her majority, Bellisant has been living a life devoted to pleasure – "Continual feasting, princely entertainments" – and Chamont fears that Bellisant's conduct will destroy her good name. Bellisant, however, refuses to change her ways; she argues that no virtue is sound if untested, and that she will live freely yet still retain her chastity.

Bellisant is at the center of a circle of high-living noblemen and ladies at the royal court; King Charles, witnessing their disputes and discontented relations, decrees that a Parliament of Love will be held, at which the unhappy lovers will be able to plead their cases. Prior to the parliament's occurrence, the play shows the bad conduct of this aristocratic set. The egotistical Clarindore, who has put aside his wife to pursue the courtier's life of indulgence, is determined to have Bellisant's virginity, even placing bets with his cronies on his success. He approaches her boldly, only to be soundly rejected and thrown out of her house – at which he tries again. (Bellisant, for her part, prefers the better-behaved Montrose.) Among Clarindore's friends, Perigot plans the seduction of Lamira, wife to Chamont, while Novall sets his sights on Clarinda, the wife of the court physician Dinant.

Another couple, Leonora and Cleremond, have the most tempestuous relationship in the play; after one of their stormy encounters, Leonora assures Cleremond that she will accept him only after he kills his best and worthiest friend. Soon after, Cleremond meets Montrose in the street; Montrose is on his way to answer a summons from Bellisant, but when he hears that Cleremond must fight a duel he puts all thoughts of love aside to serve as Cleremond's second – proving himself to be that worthiest friend that Cleremond must kill to win Leonora.

Chamont and Dinant become aware of the adulterous machinations of Perigot and Novall; they lure the two courtiers to Dinant's house, where the intended seducers are subjected to a variety of ill-treatments and humiliations. Cleremond and Montrose arrive on the "field of honor," and Cleremond reveals that the two of them will fight each other; in the ensuing combat Cleremond is defeated and wounded. Clarindore, meanwhile, finally attains an assignation with Bellisant (or so he believes); he triumphs over the humiliated Novall and Perigot as the presumed winner of their bet.

All of these matters come to a head at the King's Parliament of Love. Leonora and Cleremond confront each other, and the apparent corpse of Montrose is produced, to the shock of the assembled parties. The King decrees that the two will be married, and then Cleremond executed – forcing Leonora to repent her harshness and plead for his life. The embarrassment of the bungling seducers Perigot and Novall is exposed; and it is revealed that Clarindore has actually had sex not with Bellisant but with his abandoned wife Beaupre, who has been masquerading as Bellisant's Moorish slave Calista – an instance of the bed trick employed by Shakespeare and other dramatists of the era. And Montrose is revealed to be alive and merely counterfeiting death. The play ends with a repentant Cleremond and Leonora, and with the chastened egotists Bellisant and Clarindore re-united with their respective loves, Montrose and Beaupre. King Charles pardons Perigot and Novall...but only after they are paraded through Paris dressed as satyrs, to discourage other would-be adulterers.
