= Giovanni Medici =

Giovanni Medici may refer to:

- Don Giovanni de' Medici (1567-1621), Italian military commander and diplomat
- Giovanni de' Medici (cardinal) (1543–1562), Cardinal of the Holy Roman Church
- Giovanni delle Bande Nere (Ludovico de' Medici, 1498–1526), Italian condottiero
- Giovanni di Bicci de' Medici (c. 1360–1429), Italian banker
- Giovanni di Cosimo de' Medici (1421–1463), Italian banker
- Giovanni il Popolano (Giovanni de' Medici, 1467–1498), Italian nobleman
- Pope Leo X (Giovanni di Lorenzo de' Medici, 1475–1521), Head of the Catholic Church from 1513 to 1521
- Pope Pius IV (Giovanni Angelo Medici, 1499–1565), Head of the Catholic Church from 1559 to 1565
