= A New Way to Pay Old Debts =

Play by Philip Massinger

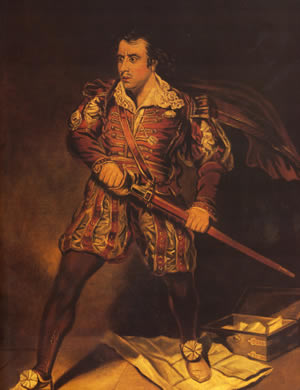
- Edmund Kean as Sir Giles Over-reach
- Written by: Philip Massinger

Premiere

A New Way to Pay Old Debts (c. 1625, printed 1633) is an English Renaissance drama, the most popular play by Philip Massinger. Its central character, Sir Giles Over-reach, became one of the more popular villains on English and American stages through the 19th century.

== Performance ==
Massinger probably wrote the play in 1625, though its debut on stage was delayed a year as the theatres were closed due to bubonic plague. In its own era it was staged by Queen Henrietta's Men at the Cockpit Theatre in Drury Lane. It was continuously in the repertory there and at the Red Bull Theatre, under the managements of Christopher Beeston, William Beeston, and Sir William Davenant, down to the closing of the theatres at the start of the English Civil War in 1642.

Though Massinger's play shows obvious debts to Thomas Middleton's A Trick to Catch the Old One (c. 1605), it transcends mere imitation to achieve a powerful dramatic effectiveness – verified by the fact that, apart from the Shakespearean canon, it was almost the only pre-Restoration play that was continuously in the dramatic repertory through much of the modern era. After David Garrick's 1748 revival, the play remained popular throughout the nineteenth century and into the twentieth. (It was praised by Thomas Jefferson.) Edmund Kean's version of Sir Giles, which debuted in 1816, was in particular a tremendous popular success, and drove the play's reputation through the remainder of the century.

The play remains in the active theatrical repertory; modern stagings are usually amateur or student productions, though the Royal Shakespeare Company performed the play in 1983, directed by Adrian Noble and with Emrys James as Sir Giles.

== Publication ==
The play was first published in 1633 in quarto by stationer Henry Seyle (his shop was "in S. Pauls Church-yard, at the signe of the Tygers head"). The 1633 quarto carries a dedication of "this trifle" to Robert Dormer, 1st Earl of Carnarvon, Master Falconer of England (he'd succeeded to his hereditary title, Chief Avenor and Keeper of the King's Hawks and Falcons, at the age of six). In this dedication, Massinger states that he "born a devoted servant to the thrice noble family of your incomparable Lady," that lady being Anna Sophia Herbert, daughter of Philip Herbert, 4th Earl of Pembroke, then serving as Lord Chamberlain. Massinger's connection to the Herbert family, derived from his father, is well known; whether Carnarvon responded in any positive way to the dedication is obscure.

The 1633 quarto was the only edition of the play in the seventeenth century. Its later popularity onstage guaranteed frequent reprints, with 52 editions between 1748 and 1964 (not counting collections); others have followed since.

== Genre ==
Dramaturgically, A New Way to Pay Old Debts contains elements of melodrama, comedy of manners, realism, and social satire, in a distinctive combination.

== The villain ==
The play also falls into the category of the "villain play", a drama in which the dominant figure is not a traditional protagonist or hero but his antagonist, a figure of evil. In the context of English Renaissance drama, the villain play grew out of the "ranting Herod" of the Medieval morality play. In the Elizabethan era, Christopher Marlowe was the great innovator in the villain play, with Tamburlaine, Doctor Faustus, and The Jew of Malta; Shakespeare's Richard III is another obvious example in the subgenre.

In A New Way to Pay Old Debts, Massinger took the villain play in a new direction of social realism: his villain is not a king or a conqueror but a credible figure from contemporary life. The play's dominating character, Sir Giles Over-reach, is based on the real-life Sir Giles Mompesson. (Sir Giles' assistant in villainy, Justice Greedy, was suggested by Mompesson's associate Sir Francis Michell.) The power of the role of Sir Giles may lie in Massinger's success in depicting a blatant villain who has a quality of everyday believability. Sir Giles is down-to-earth in his cold malice:

I'll therefore buy some cottage near his manor,
Which done, I'll make my men break ope his fences,
Ride o'er his standing corn, and in the night
Set fire on his barns, or break his cattle's legs.
These trespasses draw on suits, and suits expenses,
Which I can spare, but will soon beggar him.

— Act II, scene i

The audience is presented with a character they might meet in their own lives, to their own cost.

== Class conflict ==
The play illustrates the hardening of class distinctions that characterised the early Stuart era, leading up to the outbreak of the Civil War. In Elizabethan plays like The Shoemaker's Holiday (1599), it was acceptable and even admirable that a young nobleman marry a commoner's daughter; other plays of the era, like Fair Em (c. 1590) and The Merry Wives of Windsor (c. 1597–9), share this liberal attitude toward social mobility through marriage. In A New Way to Pay Old Debts, in contrast, Lord Lovell would rather see his family line go extinct than marry Over-reach's daughter Margaret, even though she is young, beautiful, and virtuous. In Act IV, scene i, Lovell specifies that his attitude is not solely dependent on his loathing of the father's personal vices, but is rooted in class distinction. Lovell rejects the idea of his descendants being "one part scarlet" (aristocratic) and "the other London blue" (common).

The drama's class conflict can seem obscure to the modern reader, since Sir Giles Over-reach appears as an upper-class, not a lower-class figure: he is a knight and a rich man with large country estates, who lives the lavish lifestyle of the landed gentry. There is even a family connection between hero and villain: Frank Welborn is the nephew of Sir Giles' late wife. Yet Sir Giles himself expresses the conflict by noting that he is a "city" man—he comes from the financial milieu of the City of London with its worldly and materialistic values, the domain of nascent capitalism in contrast to the older social order rooted in feudalism. He observes that there is "More than a feud, a strange antipathy / Between us", the men of money, "and true gentry".

For a conservative moralist like Massinger, the upper classes, the "true gentry", have a right to run society insofar as they fulfil the moral and ethical obligations of their traditional roles. It is Over-reach's rejection of those tradition moral and ethical standards, his embrace of ruthless competition, that makes him a villain.

== Synopsis ==
Set in rural Nottinghamshire, the play opens with its protagonist, Frank Welborn, being ejected from an alehouse by Tapwell and Froth, the tavernkeeper and his wife. Welborn has been refused further service ("No booze? nor no tobacco?"); he quarrels with the couple and beats them, but is interrupted by Tom Allworth. The conversations in the scene supply the play's backstory, indicating that Welborn and Allworth are both members of the local gentry who have fallen victim to the financial manipulations of Sir Giles Over-reach. Welborn has lost his estates and been reduced to penury, while young Allworth has been forced to become the page of a local nobleman, Lord Lovell. Allworth offers Welborn a small sum, "eight pieces", to relieve his immediate wants, but Welborn indignantly rejects the offer from a junior contemporary; he says that as his own vices have led to his fall, he will rely on his own wits for his recovery.

Tom Allworth's widowed mother, Lady Allworth, retains her country house; she is visited there by neighbours and prospective suitors, including Sir Giles. While she has her servants greet these guests with appropriate hospitality, she remains "cloister'd up" in the seclusion of her mourning. When Sir Giles visits, he is accompanied by his two prime henchmen, the lawyer Jack Marall and Justice Greedy, the local justice of the peace. Together, Greedy and the Lady's servants provide most of the play's comic relief. Greedy is a lean man with an enormous appetite; a gourmand and a glutton, he is obsessed with food.

Lady Allworth instructs her son to avoid the dissolute Welborn; but Welborn forces his way into her presence, and reminds her of his relationship with her late husband. When the late Allworth had been down on his luck, Welborn had supported him, even seconding him in all his duels. The recollection makes Lady Allworth repent her harsh attitude toward the reprobate Welborn, and she offers him financial help; he rejects this, but requests a favour of her instead. The request is made in a whisper; the audience discovers its nature as the plot progresses.

Over-reach is shown with Marall, discussing his plan to marry his daughter Margaret to Lord Lovell. He also gives a first glimpse into the ruthless way he conducts his business affairs. Welborn seeks out Over-reach, but Sir Giles refuses to speak with him; Marall mocks his poverty. Yet Marall has to change his tune when he sees Lady Allworth come out of mourning to meet Welborn. When she kisses Welborn, Marall is convinced that the two will marry. When Marall informs Over-reach of what he's seen, however, Over-reach refuses to believe him, and even beats him. Eventually, though, Over-reach himself sees Welborn and Lady Allworth together, and accepts the "truth" of their connection. Sir Giles favours their marriage, since he is sure that once Welborn possesses the Lady's remaining property he can cheat the dissolute man of this property too.

Margaret Over-reach has no interest in marrying Lord Lovell, since she is in love with Tom Allworth, as he is with her. Lord Lovell knows of his page's affections, and is willing to act as a go-between for the two. Young Allworth is nervous at this, suspecting that his patron will not be able to resist Margaret's charms; but Lovell is an honourable man, and sincerely promotes their match. Over-reach thinks that Allworth is carrying messages between the Lord and his daughter, though the young page is actually pursuing his own romance. Together, the young couple manages to fool Sir Giles into thinking that Lovell wants a reluctant Margaret to elope with him; Over-reach pressures his daughter to conform, and even sends hurried written instructions to a compliant clergyman at the village of Gotham, to marry his daughter to "this man." Of course he means Lovell, though the ambiguity favours the young lovers.

To facilitate the marriage of Welborn and Lady Allworth, Sir Giles advances Welborn a thousand pounds. He also discusses his plans with Lovell, revealing more of his intentions and his dark character, so that Lovell breaks into a "cold sweat" listening to him. (With each of his appearances in the play, Over-reach's expressions of his villainy become more flagrant and overwrought, leading up to the denouement of the final scene.) Marall sees Welborn's apparent ascension in fortune, and, chafing at Over-reach's insulting and brutal treatment of him, decides to switch allegiances; his command of Over-reach's legal papers gives Marall a key advantage in seeking his own revenge.

When Over-reach believes that Lovell and Margaret are married, he enters a state of near rapture: "My ends! my ends are compass'd! . . . I can scarce contain myself, / I am so full of joy; nay, joy all over!" The play's final scene shows his sudden reversal, when he realises that he has been fooled and that Margaret has married Allworth. Enraged, he demands that Welborn provide security for the loan of £1000 from the Lady's estates; Welborn rejects this, and demands that Over-reach return possession of his lands. Sir Giles dismisses this as folly—but discovers that the text of his deed to Welborn's lands has mysteriously faded away (thanks to the trickery of Marall). Over-reach is ready to work his revenge with his sword, but Welborn, Lovell, and the Lady's servants altogether are too formidable for him. He storms out, but returns in a distracted state of mind. The stresses of his reversal of fortune have caused him to lose his sanity, and he is taken into protective custody.

Welborn decides to demonstrate his reformation by taking a military commission in the regiment Lovell commands. Lovell and Lady Allworth have agreed to marry. Allworth and Margaret state that they will turn control of Over-reach's estates to Lord Lovell, to make reparations for all to the people Sir Giles has cheated and oppressed.

== Critical responses ==
The play's prominence in theatrical history has won it the attention of scholars and critics. Some of the criticism has been favourable; one editor judged it "a highly finished, integrated piece of work, with everything handsomely symmetrical about it." Yet critics have not been shy about finding faults; one called Sir Giles Over-reach "the character whom his author could not control." Massinger's blending of lighter dramatic materials, like comedy of intrigue, with the play's more serious aspects, has also been faulted.

== In performance ==
- A New Way to Pay Old Debts at the Internet Broadway Database
