= John Lowin =

16th/17th-century English actor and theatre sharer

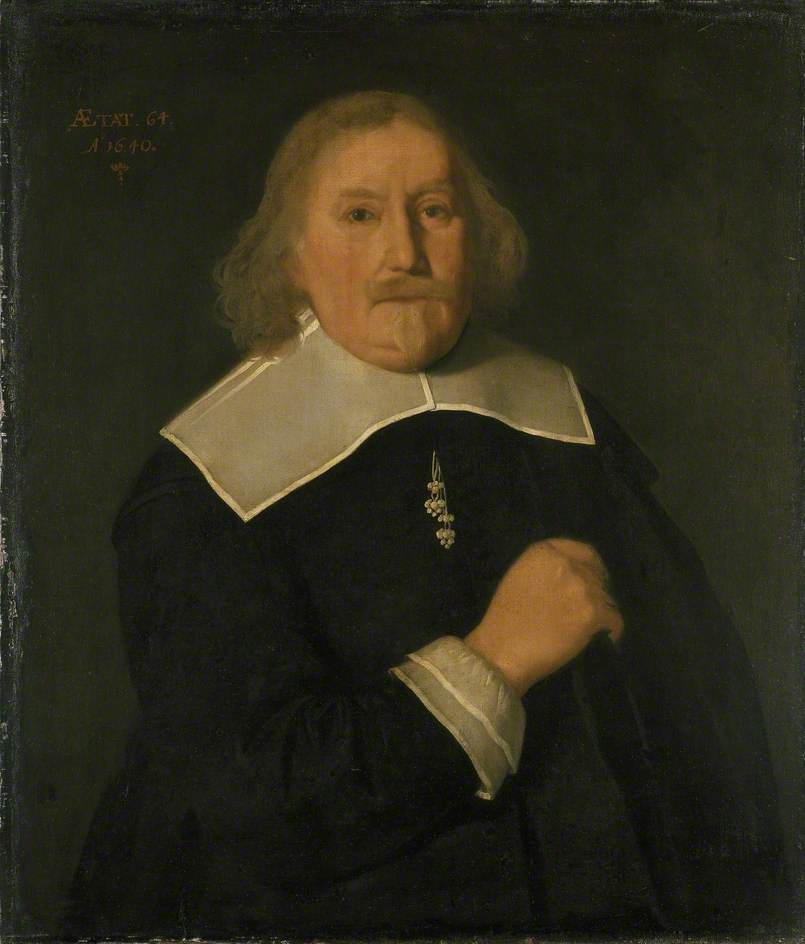
John Lowin (Ashmolean Museum, Oxford)

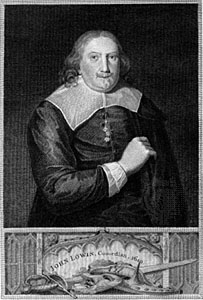
John Lowin, engraving by Thomas Holloway, after the original painting

John Lowin (baptized 9 December 1576 – buried 18 March 1659 or 16 March 1669) was an English actor.

== Early life ==
Born in St Giles-without-Cripplegate, London, Lowin was the son of a tanner. Like Robert Armin, he was apprenticed to a goldsmith. While he is not recorded as a free citizen of this company, he did perform as a goldsmith, Leofstane, in a 1611 city pageant written by Anthony Munday. This pageant was commissioned by the Goldsmiths' Company in honor of the election of one of their company as Lord Mayor; in the document employing him, Lowin is described as a "brother" of the company, suggesting some form of ongoing relationship with that community. He lived in Southwark, where parish registers record two marriages involving a man of his name (in 1607 and 1620); the latter definitely involved the actor.

== Career ==
Lowin was definitely associated with the theatrical world by 1602. His name frequently occurs in the account books of Philip Henslowe in 1602, when he was playing with Worcester's Men at Rose Theatre in Bankside; a note in Henslowe's book places him in a travelling company in the same year. By late 1603, he had joined the new King's Men, apparently as a hired man rather than a sharer, as his name is not mentioned in the original royal patent. He probably became a sharer in 1604, when the total number of sharers was likely increased to twelve.

That he became important to the company fairly quickly is suggested by his appearance as himself (alongside Richard Burbage and Henry Condell) in the induction to John Marston's The Malcontent. He is mentioned in the surviving cast lists of the company's productions of Ben Jonson's Sejanus (1603), Volpone (1605), The Alchemist (1610), and Catiline (1611), John Fletcher's Bonduca and Valentinian (both ca. 1613), and John Webster's The Duchess of Malfi (ca. 1614).

Lowin's prowess as an actor is displayed by a remarkable fact about the plays in which he acted. In the hundreds of plays, and the thousands of roles in them, that date to the 1580–1610 era, there are only about twenty roles of 800 lines or longer. Only three plays have two roles of this scale: Shakespeare's Othello and Jonson's Volpone and The Alchemist. Burbage played the starring role in the King's Men's productions of these plays—;and Lowin apparently was the man who seconded him (just as Lowin is known to have played Bosola to Burbage's Ferdinand in The Duchess of Malfi). In all likelihood it was Lowin who played Iago to Burbage's Othello, Mosca to his Volpone, and Subtle to his Face.

Edward Alleyn's diary speaks of his dining with Lowin in 1620. When John Heminges died in 1630, Lowin purchased an eighth of the total shares in the Globe and Blackfriars Theatres. Together with Cuthbert Burbage, Richard Robinson and Winifred (d.1642), his wife, William Heminges, and Joseph Taylor, Lowin filed a Bill of Complaint on 28 January 1632 in the Court of Requests against the owner of the Globe, Sir Matthew Brend, in order to obtain confirmation of an extension of the 31-year lease originally granted by Sir Matthew Brend's father, Nicholas Brend.

With the death of Heminges in 1630, the old guard left over from the Lord Chamberlain's Men had finally passed. From that year until the theaters closed in 1642, Lowin (together with Joseph Taylor) assumed the roles previously fulfilled by Heminges, serving as treasurers and as contacts with the court and with the Master of the Revels. In 1633, he was scolded by Sir Henry Herbert for staging Fletcher's The Woman's Prize without censorship. After the theaters closed in 1642, Lowin may have kept an inn (called the Three Pigeons) at Brentford, where he died in 1659, at the age of eighty-two.

Lowin was one of the ten King's Men who signed the dedication in the 1647 Beaumont and Fletcher First Folio; also, he signed the 1652 edition of Fletcher's The Wild Goose Chase with Joseph Taylor. In the 25 cast lists added to plays in the second Beaumont and Fletcher folio of 1679, Lowin's name is mentioned in the lists for 21 dramas, more than any other single actor:

- Bonduca
- The Custom of the Country
- The Double Marriage
- The False One
- The Humorous Lieutenant
- The Island Princess
- The Knight of Malta
- The Laws of Candy
- The Little French Lawyer
- The Loyal Subject
- The Lovers' Progress
- The Mad Lover
- The Maid in the Mill
- The Pilgrim
- The Prophetess
- The Queen of Corinth
- The Sea Voyage
- The Spanish Curate
- Valentinian
- The Wild Goose Chase
- Women Pleased

Lowin, whose portrait in the Ashmolean Museum reveals as a large and imposing figure, is often associated with comic characters, especially those of a "stout blunt humor," including Falstaff and Melantius in Beaumont and Fletcher's The Maid's Tragedy. On the authority of James Wright's Historia Histrionica (1699), he is also associated with Jonson's Epicure Mammon (The Alchemist), Morose (Epicoene), and the title role in Volpone. Again on Wright's report, Lowin is supposed to have originated the role of Bosola in The Duchess of Malfi, and he was probably also the original Flaminius in Philip Massinger's Believe as You List. Finally, in Roscius Anglicanus, John Downes reports that Lowin originated the title role in Shakespeare and Fletcher's Henry VIII.

== Legacy ==
Lowin was the author of a single literary work (as far as is known), a brief pamphlet titled Conclusions upon Dances that was first printed in 1607. The text of the pamphlet cites positive and negative examples of dances mentioned in the Bible.
