= Beaumont and Fletcher =

Team writers of the early Jacobean era

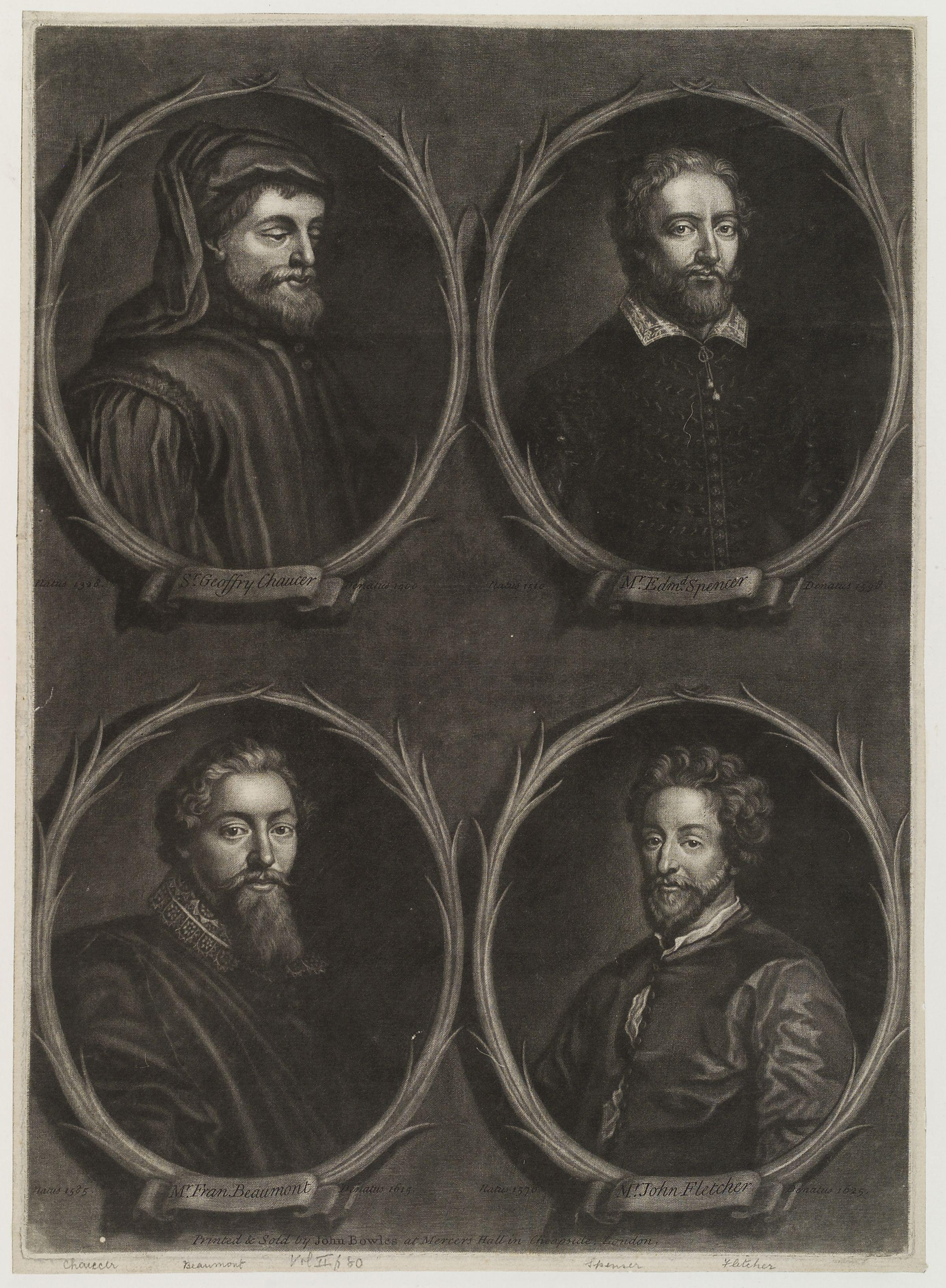
Geoffrey Chaucer, Edmund Spenser, Francis Beaumont and John Fletcher

Beaumont and Fletcher were the English dramatists Francis Beaumont and John Fletcher, who collaborated in their writing during the reign of James I (1603–25).

They became known as a team early in their association, so much so that their joined names were applied to the total canon of Fletcher, including his solo works and the plays he composed with various other collaborators including Philip Massinger and Nathan Field.

The first Beaumont and Fletcher folio of 1647 contained 35 plays; 53 plays were included in the second folio in 1679. Other works bring the total plays in the canon to about 55. While scholars and critics will probably never render a unanimous verdict on the authorship of all these plays—especially given the difficulties of some of the individual cases—contemporary scholarship has arrived at a corpus of about 12 to 15 plays that are the work of both men. (See the individual pages on Beaumont and Fletcher for more details.)

== Works ==
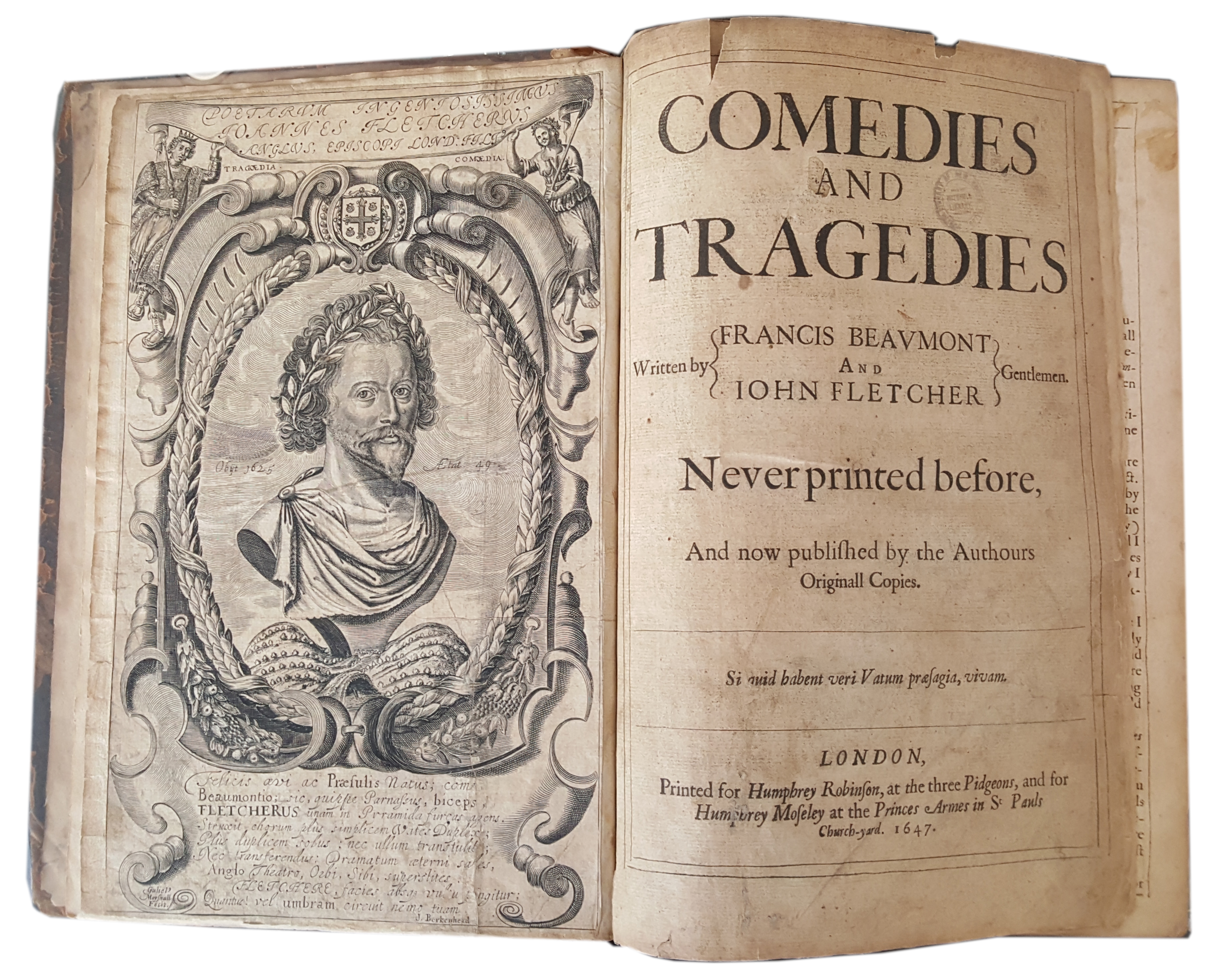
Frontispiece from the first folio of 1647

The plays generally recognised as Beaumont/Fletcher collaborations:

- The Woman Hater, comedy (1606; printed 1607)
- Cupid's Revenge, tragedy (c. 1607–12; printed 1615)
- Philaster, or Love Lies a-Bleeding, tragicomedy (c. 1609; printed 1629)
- The Maid's Tragedy, tragedy (c. 1609; printed 1619)
- A King and No King, tragicomedy (1611; printed 1619)
- The Captain, comedy (c. 1609–12; printed 1647)
- The Scornful Lady, comedy (c. 1613; printed 1616)
- Love's Pilgrimage, tragicomedy (c. 1615–16; 1647)
- The Noble Gentleman, comedy (licensed 3 February 1626; printed 1647).

Beaumont/Fletcher plays, later revised by Massinger:

- Thierry and Theodoret, tragedy (c. 1607?; printed 1621)
- The Coxcomb, comedy (1608–10; printed 1647)
- Beggars' Bush, comedy (c. 1612–13?; revised 1622?; printed 1647)
- Love's Cure, comedy (c. 1612–13?; revised 1625?; printed 1647).

Due to Fletcher's distinctive pattern of contractional forms and linguistic preferences ('em for them, ye for you, etc.), his hand can be fairly readily distinguished from Beaumont's in their collaborative works. In A King and No King, Beaumont wrote Acts I, II, and III in their entirety, plus scene IV, iv and V, ii and iv, while Fletcher wrote only the first three scenes in Act IV (IV, i-iii) and the first and third scenes of Act V (V, i and iii). The play is more Beaumont's than it is Fletcher's. Beaumont also dominates in The Maid's Tragedy, The Noble Gentleman, Philaster, and The Woman Hater. In contrast, The Captain, The Coxcomb, Cupid's Revenge, Beggars' Bush, and The Scornful Lady contain more of Fletcher's work than Beaumont's. The cases of Thierry and Theodoret and Love's Cure are somewhat confused by Massinger's revision; but in these plays too, Fletcher appears the dominant partner.

Critics and scholars debate other plays. Fletcher clearly wrote the last two quarters of Four Plays in One, another play in his canon—and he clearly didn't write the first two sections. Many scholars attribute the play's first half to Nathan Field—though some prefer Beaumont. Given the limits of the existing evidence, some of these questions may be unresolvable with currently available techniques.
