= Philip Massinger =

English playwright (1583–1640)

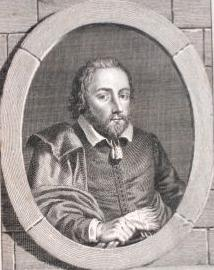
Philip Massinger, copper-engraving portrait by Charles Grignion the Elder

Philip Massinger (1583 – 17 March 1640) was an English dramatist. His plays, including A New Way to Pay Old Debts, The City Madam, and The Roman Actor, are noted for their satire and realism, and their political and social themes.

== Early life ==
The son of Arthur Massinger or Messanger, he was baptised at St. Thomas's Salisbury on 24 November 1583. He apparently belonged to an old Salisbury family, for the name occurs in the city records as early as 1415. He is described in his matriculation entry at St. Alban Hall, Oxford (1602), as the son of a gentleman. His father, who had also been educated at St. Alban Hall, was a member of parliament, and was attached to the household of Henry Herbert, 2nd Earl of Pembroke. Herbert recommended Arthur in 1587 for the office of examiner in the Court of the Marches.

William Herbert, 3rd Earl of Pembroke, who would come to oversee the London Stage and the royal company as King James's Lord Chamberlain, succeeded to the title in 1601. It has been suggested that he supported Massinger at Oxford, but the omission of any reference to him in any of Massinger's prefaces points to the contrary. Massinger left Oxford without a degree in 1606. His father had died in 1603, and that may have left him without financial assistance. The lack of a degree and the want of patronage from Lord Pembroke may both be explained on the supposition that he had become Roman Catholic. On leaving the university he went to London to make his living as a dramatist, but his name cannot be definitely affixed to any play until fifteen years later, when The Virgin Martyr (registered with the Stationers Company, 7 December 1621) appeared as the work of Massinger and Thomas Dekker.

== First plays ==
During these years he worked in collaboration with other dramatists. A joint letter, from Nathan Field, Robert Daborne and Philip Massinger, to Philip Henslowe, begs for an immediate loan of five pounds to release them from their "unfortunate extremity", the money to be taken from the balance due for the "play of Mr. Fletcher's and ours." A second document shows that Massinger and Daborne owed Henslowe £3 on 4 July 1615. The earlier note probably dates from 1613, and from this time Massinger apparently worked regularly with John Fletcher. Sir Aston Cockayne, Massinger's constant friend and patron, refers in explicit terms to this collaboration in a sonnet addressed to Humphrey Moseley on the publication of his folio edition of Beaumont and Fletcher (Small Poems of Divers Sorts, 1658), and in an epitaph on the two poets he says: "Plays they did write together, were great friends, And now one grave includes them in their ends."

== Massinger and the King's Men ==
After Philip Henslowe's death in 1616 Massinger and Fletcher began to write for the King's Men. Between 1623 and 1626 Massinger produced unaided for the Lady Elizabeth's Men, then playing at the Cockpit Theatre, three pieces, The Parliament of Love, The Bondman and The Renegado. With the exception of these plays and The Great Duke of Florence, produced in 1627 by Queen Henrietta's Men, Massinger continued to write regularly for the King's Men until his death. The tone of the dedications of his later plays affords evidence of his continued poverty. In the preface to The Maid of Honour (1632) he wrote, addressing Sir Francis Foljambe and Sir Thomas Bland: "I had not to this time subsisted, but that I was supported by your frequent courtesies and favours."

The prologue to The Guardian (licensed 1633) refers to two unsuccessful plays and two years of silence, when the author feared he had lost the popular favour. It is probable that this break in his production was owing to his free handling of political matters. In 1631, Sir Henry Herbert, the Master of the Revels, refused to license an unnamed play by Massinger because of "dangerous matter as the deposing of Sebastian, King of Portugal", calculated presumably to endanger good relations between England and Spain. There is little doubt that this was the same piece as Believe as You List, in which time and place are changed, Antiochus being substituted for Sebastian, and Rome for Spain. In the prologue, Massinger ironically apologises for his ignorance of history, and professes that his accuracy is at fault if his picture comes near "a late and sad example." The obvious "late and sad example" of a wandering prince could be no other than Charles I's brother-in-law, the Elector Palatine. An allusion to the same subject may be traced in The Maid of Honour. In another play by Massinger, not extant, Charles I is reported to have himself struck out a passage put into the mouth of Don Pedro, king of Spain, as "too insolent." The poet seems to have adhered closely to the politics of his patron, Philip Herbert, 4th Earl of Pembroke, who had leanings to democracy and was a personal enemy of the Duke of Buckingham. The servility towards the Crown displayed in Beaumont and Fletcher's plays reflected the temper of the court of James I. The attitude of Massinger's heroes and heroines towards kings is very different. Camiola's remarks on the limitations of the royal prerogative (Maid of Honour, Act V, Scene v) could hardly be acceptable at court.

== Death ==
Massinger died suddenly at his house near the Globe Theatre, and was buried in the churchyard of St. Saviour's, Southwark, on 18 March 1640. In the entry in the parish register he is described as a "stranger", which, however, implies nothing more than that he belonged to another parish. He is buried in the same tomb as Fletcher. That grave can be seen to this day in the chancel of what is now Southwark Cathedral near London Bridge on the south bank of the Thames. There the names of Fletcher and Massinger appear on adjacent plaques laid in the floor between the choir stalls. Next to these is a plaque commemorating Edmund Shakespeare (William's younger brother) who is buried in the cathedral, although the exact location of his grave is unknown.

== Religion and politics ==
The supposition that Massinger was a Roman Catholic rests upon three of his plays, The Virgin Martyr (licensed 1620), The Renegado (licensed 1624) and The Maid of Honour (c. 1621). The Virgin Martyr, in which Dekker probably had a large share, is really a miracle play, dealing with the martyrdom of Dorothea in the time of Diocletian, and the supernatural element is freely used. Caution must be used in interpreting this play as an elucidation of Massinger's views; it is not entirely his work. In The Renegado, however, the action is dominated by the beneficent influence of a Jesuit priest, Francisco, and the doctrine of baptismal regeneration is enforced. In The Maid of Honour a complicated situation is solved by the decision of the heroine, Camiola, to take the veil. For this she is held up "to all posterity a fair example for noble maids to imitate."

Conversely, characters in Massinger's plays sometimes masquerade as Catholic clergy (The Bashful Lover) and even hear believers' confessions (The Emperor of the East)—a violation of a sacrament that would be surprising for a Catholic.

As noted above, Massinger placed moral and religious concerns over political considerations, in ways that offended the interests of king and state in his generation. While not a "democrat" in any modern sense (no one in his society was), Massinger's political sympathies, insofar as we can determine them from his works, might have placed him in a predicament similar to that of the head of the house he revered, the Earl of Pembroke—who found that he could not support King Charles in the English Civil War, and became one of the few noblemen to back the Parliamentary side. Massinger did not live long enough to have to take a position in that conflict.

== Style and influence ==
It seems doubtful whether Massinger was ever a popular playwright, for the best qualities of his plays would appeal rather to politicians and moralists than to the ordinary playgoer. He contributed, however, at least one great and popular character to the English stage. Sir Giles Overreach, in A New Way to Pay Old Debts, is a sort of commercial Richard III, a compound of the lion and the fox, and the part provides many opportunities for a great actor. He made another considerable contribution to the comedy of manners in The City Madam. In Massinger's own judgment The Roman Actor was "the most perfect birth of his Minerva." It is a study of the tyrant Domitian, and of the results of despotic rule on the despot himself and his court. Other favourable examples of his grave and restrained art are The Duke of Milan, The Bondman and The Great Duke of Florence.

For an examination of William Shakespeare's influence on Massinger, see T. S. Eliot's essay on Massinger. It includes the famous line, "Immature poets imitate; mature poets steal...."

In 2021, Making Massinger, a play by Simon Butteriss, was recorded and streamed by Wiltshire Creative, who commissioned it. The play is in verse and described as a revenge tragicomedy. The cast includes Samuel Barnett, Edward Bennett, Hubert Burton, Julia Hills, Jane How and Nina Wadia.

== Canon of Massinger's works ==
The following scheme is based on the work of Cyrus Hoy, Ian Fletcher, and Terence P. Logan. (See References.)

=== Solo plays ===
- The Maid of Honour, tragicomedy (c. 1621; printed 1632)
- The Duke of Milan, tragedy (c. 1621–3; printed 1623, 1638)
- The Unnatural Combat, tragedy (c. 1621–6; printed 1639)
- The Bondman, tragicomedy (licensed 3 December 1623; printed 1624)
- The Renegado, tragicomedy (licensed 17 April 1624; printed 1630)
- The Parliament of Love, comedy (licensed 3 November 1624; MS)
- A New Way to Pay Old Debts, comedy (c. 1625; printed 1632)
- The Roman Actor, tragedy (licensed 11 October 1626; printed 1629)
- The Great Duke of Florence, tragicomedy (licensed 5 July 1627; printed 1636)
- The Picture, tragicomedy (licensed 8 June 1629; printed 1630)
- The Emperor of the East, tragicomedy (licensed 11 March 1631; printed 1632)
- Believe as You List, tragedy (rejected by the censor in January, but licensed 6 May 1631; MS)
- The City Madam, comedy (licensed 25 May 1632; printed 1658)
- The Guardian, comedy (licensed 31 October 1633; printed 1655)
- The Bashful Lover, tragicomedy (licensed 9 May 1636; printed 1655)

=== Collaborations ===
With John Fletcher:

- Sir John van Olden Barnavelt, tragedy (August 1619; MS)
- The Little French Lawyer, comedy (c. 1619–23; printed 1647)
- A Very Woman, tragicomedy (c. 1619–22; licensed 6 June 1634; printed 1655)
- The Custom of the Country, comedy (c. 1619–23; printed 1647)
- The Double Marriage, tragedy (c. 1619–23; Printed 1647)
- The False One, history (c. 1619–23; printed 1647)
- The Prophetess, tragicomedy (licensed 14 May 1622; printed 1647)
- The Sea Voyage, comedy (licensed 22 June 1622; printed 1647)
- The Spanish Curate, comedy (licensed 24 October 1622; printed 1647)
- The Lovers' Progress or The Wandering Lovers, tragicomedy (licensed 6 December 1623; revised 1634; printed 1647)
- The Elder Brother, comedy (c. 1625; printed 1637).

With John Fletcher and Francis Beaumont:

- Thierry and Theodoret, tragedy (c. 1607?; printed 1621)
- The Coxcomb, comedy (1608–10; printed 1647)
- Beggars' Bush, comedy (c. 1612–15?; revised 1622?; printed 1647)
- Love's Cure, comedy (c. 1612–15?; revised 1625?; printed 1647).

With John Fletcher and Nathan Field:

- The Honest Man's Fortune, tragicomedy (1613; printed 1647)
- The Queen of Corinth, tragicomedy (c. 1616–18; printed 1647)
- The Knight of Malta, tragicomedy (c. 1619; printed 1647).

With Nathan Field:

- The Fatal Dowry, tragedy (c. 1619, printed 1632); adapted by Nicholas Rowe: The Fair Penitent

With John Fletcher, John Ford, and William Rowley (?), or John Webster (?):

- The Fair Maid of the Inn, comedy (licensed 22 January 1626; printed 1647).

With John Fletcher, Ben Jonson, and George Chapman (?):

- Rollo Duke of Normandy, or The Bloody Brother, tragedy (c. 1616–24; printed 1639).

With Thomas Dekker:

- The Virgin Martyr, tragedy (licensed 6 October 1620; printed 1622).

With Thomas Middleton and William Rowley:

- The Old Law, comedy (c. 1615–18; printed 1656).

Some of these "collaborations" are in fact more complex: revisions by Massinger of older plays by Fletcher and others, etc. (It is not necessary to suppose that Massinger, Fletcher, Ford, and Rowley-or-Webster sat down in a room together to write a play.)

More than a dozen of Massinger's plays are said to be lost, (Note: In his edition, Gifford cites the comedies The Noble Choice, The Wandering Lovers, Antonio and Vallia, Fast and Welcome, The Woman's Plot, and The Spanish Viceroy; the tragedies The Forced Lady, The Tyrant, Minerva's Sacrifice, The Tragedy of Cleander, and The Italian Nightpiece, or The Unfortunate Piety; the tragicomedy Philenzo and Hippolita; and six plays of unspecified genre, The Judge, The Honour of Women, The Orator, The King and the Subject, Alexius, or The Chaste Lover, and The Prisoner, or The Fair Anchoress of Pausilippo.) though the titles of some of these may be duplicates of those of existing plays. Eleven of these lost plays were manuscripts used by John Warburton's cook for lighting fires and making pies. The tragedy The Jeweller of Amsterdam (c. 1616–19) may be a lost collaboration, with Fletcher and Field.

The list given above represents a consensus of scholarship; individual critics have assigned various other plays, or portions of plays, to Massinger—like The Faithful Friends, or the first two acts of The Second Maiden's Tragedy (1611).

Massinger's independent works were collected by Thomas Coxeter (4 vols., 1759, revised edition with introduction by Thomas Davies, 1779), by J. Monck Mason (4 vols., 1779), by William Gifford (4 vols., 1805, 1813), by Hartley Coleridge (1840), by Lt. Col. Cunningham (1867), and selections by Arthur Symons in the Mermaid Series (1887–1889).

Subsequent work on Massinger includes Philip Edwards and Colin Gibson, eds., The Plays and Poems of Philip Massinger (5 vols., Oxford, 1976), Martin Garrett, ed., Massinger: the Critical Heritage (London, 1991), chapters in Annabel Patterson, Censorship and Interpretation: the Conditions of Writing and Reading in Early Modern England (Madison, 1984) and Martin Butler, Theatre and Crisis 1632–1642 (Cambridge, 1984), and Martin Garrett, "Philip Massinger" in the revised Dictionary of National Biography (Oxford, 2005).
