= Swetnam =

Swetnam is a surname. Notable people with the surname include:

- Huw Swetnam, British slalom canoeist
- Joseph Swetnam (died 1621), English pamphleteer and fencing master
- Thomas W. Swetnam (born 1955), American dendrochronologist

== See also ==
- Swetnam the Woman-Hater, a Jacobean era stage play
