= Anger (surname) =

Anger is a surname. Notable people with the name include:

== People ==
- Ain Anger (born 1971), Estonian opera bass
- Bryan Anger (born 1988), American football player
- Cédric Anger (born 1975), French film director and screenwriter
- Darol Anger (born 1953), American violinist
- Ed Anger, pseudonymous American columnist
- Edvin Anger (born 2002), Swedish cross-country skier
- Erling Anger (1909–1999), Norwegian civil servant
- Hal Anger (1920–2005), American scientist, inventor of the Anger camera
- Louis Anger (1878–1946), American entertainer
- Jane Anger (16th century), English author
- Kenneth Anger (1927–2023), American filmmaker
- Matt Anger (born 1963), American tennis player
- Per Anger (1913–2002), Swedish diplomat
- Roger Anger (1923–2008), French architect
- Staffan Anger (born 1943), Swedish politician

== Fictional characters ==
- Dirk Anger, fictional character in Marvel Comics' Nextwave

== See also ==
- Anger (disambiguation)
- Agner (disambiguation)
