= Swetnam the Woman-Hater =

Jacobean era stage play

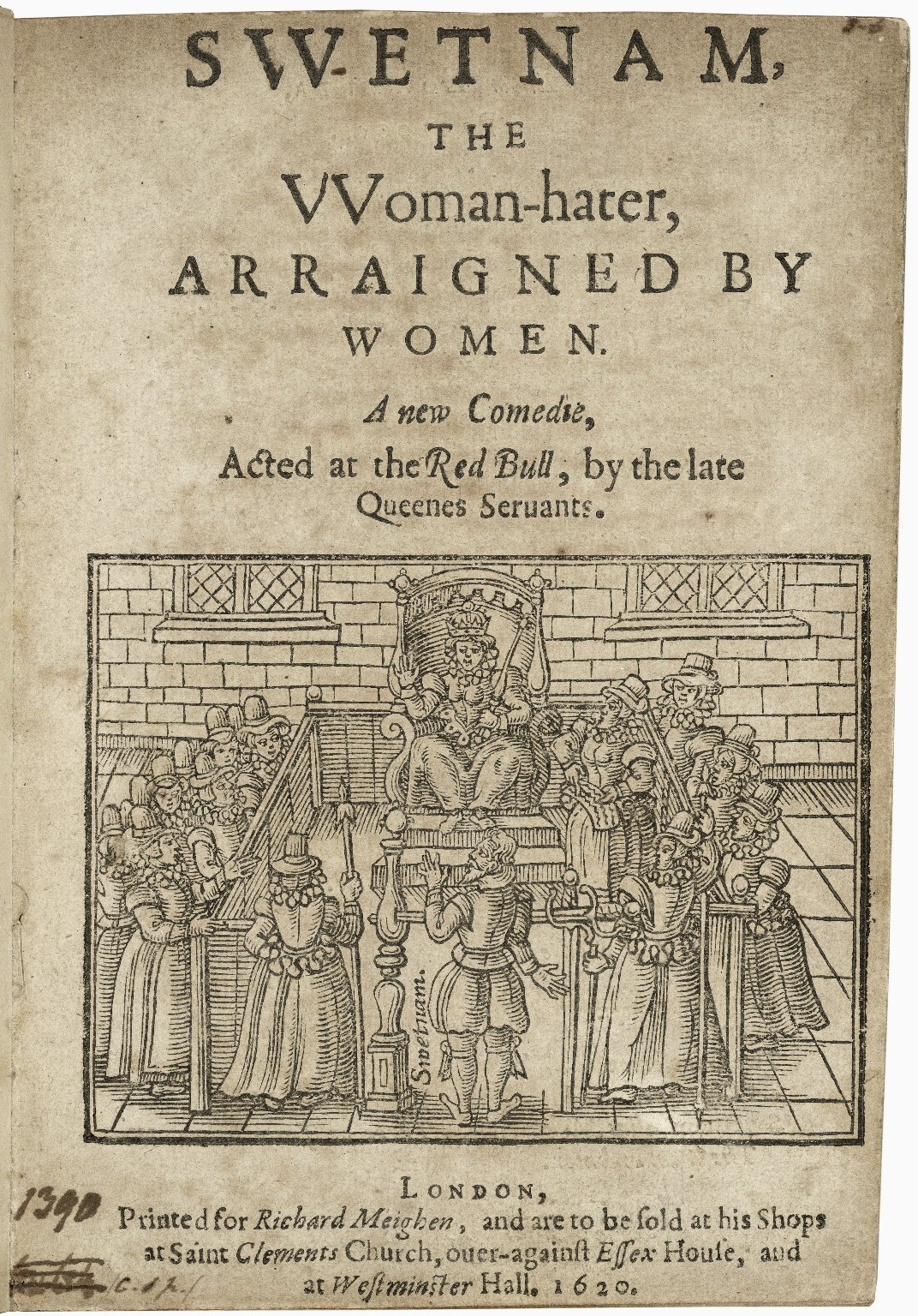
Swetnam, the Woman-hater, arraigned by women, printed by William Stansby for Richard Meighen, 1620

Swetnam the Woman-Hater Arraigned by Women is a Jacobean era stage play from the English Renaissance, an anonymous comedy that was part of a controversy during the 1615 – 1620 period.

== Performance and publication ==
Swetnam the Woman-Hater was first published in 1620, in a quarto issued by Richard Meighen. The title page of the quarto states that the play was performed by Queen Anne's Men at the Red Bull Theatre; the most likely date for the first performance is considered to have been in late 1618 or 1619. The play was not reprinted in its own era (in fact, not until 1880); but it was revived onstage around 1633.

In one key respect, the Red Bull Theatre was an odd venue for the play Swetnam and its positive and genteel attitude toward women. The Red Bull had a reputation as the roughest and rowdiest of the theatres of its day, and at least one source suggests that some women avoided it. According to a contemporaneous doggerel,

The Red Bull
Is mostly full
Of drovers, carriers, carters;
But honest wenches
Will shun the benches
And not there show their garters.

Perhaps the Red Bull audience mellowed with time; or perhaps it was never as narrow and mean as reputed, as A. B. Grosart suggests in his edition of the play.

Conversely, Queen Anne's Men may have chosen the play to appeal to the "up-scale" new audience they wanted to serve. In 1617, the Queen Anne's company moved from the open-air, "public" Red Bull to the enclosed "private" theatre the Cockpit, which had a more "elite" clientele. But the crowds of apprentices who made up a large portion of the company's audience were outraged at the move. The private theatres' ticket prices were five or six times higher than the public theatres' admission fees. (In the Jacobean era, the cheapest ticket to the "public" Globe Theatre was a penny, while the minimum for the "private" Blackfriars Theatre was sixpence.) The young men were being priced out of their basic entertainment. In the famous Shrove Tuesday riot of 1617, the 'prentices damaged the Cockpit badly enough to delay its opening, and the Queen's Men had to remain at the Red Bull until repairs were done. Swetnam may have been the kind of play the company intended for their projected new home at the Cockpit.

== Controversy ==
The play was one item, and apparently the final one, in a controversy that erupted in 1615 with the publication of Joseph Swetnam's misogynistic tract The Arraignment of Lewd, Idle, Froward, and Unconstant Women. Swetnam's work attracted abundant attention, and provoked three responses in defence of women: Rachel Speght's A Muzzle for Melastomus (Note: "Melastomus" means "black mouth," indicating the "foul-mouthed" Swetnam.) (1617), and two works published under pseudonyms—Esther Hath Hang'd Haman by "Esther Sowernam" and The Worming of a Mad Dog by "Constantia Munda" (both also 1617). The pseudonyms are thought to represent other female authors, making this polemical response to Swetnam a rare cluster of early 17th-century works written by women. The play Swetnam the Woman-Hater shows internal signs of being the final response to Swetnam in the relevant period.

More generally, Swetnam the Woman-Hater is one of a long-running series of English Renaissance plays on what can be called, very broadly, the gender question. Earlier plays in this subgenre would include Shakespeare's The Taming of the Shrew and Beaumont and Fletcher's The Woman Hater and The Woman's Prize. Beyond the confines of the drama, there was an abundant literature on the subject. Swetnam's tract was only one in a long series of similar attacks on women. Countervailing defences of women were less common, though not unknown; examples include Jane Anger's Protection for Women (1589) and Moderata Fonte's The Worth of Women: Wherein is Clearly Revealed Their Nobility and Their Superiority to Men (1600).

== Plot source ==
The play's subplot deals with Swetnam, who is brought to trial before a court of women for his offences against the gender and ends up recanting his bias. The play's main plot, a story of political intrigue and courtly love, derives from a novel by Juan de Flores called the Historia de Aurelio e Isabella (also known as Grisel y Mirabella), written c. 1495 (the same novel provided John Fletcher with plot material for his Women Pleased). De Flores' novel was popular, and had been published in English translation five times between 1556 and 1586. It has been argued that the play also shows specific debts to earlier dramas, notably George Peele's The Arraignment of Paris and John Lyly's Endymion.

The tone of de Flores' novel is strongly chivalric, a trait that carries over into the play. "Swetnam the Woman-Hater is remarkable for the unusually high moral tone it adopts with regard to women."

== Authorship ==
No external evidence indicates the identity of the play's author; Thomas Heywood, Thomas Dekker, and Thomas Drue have been proposed as candidates. (A "Thomas Drewe" acted with Queen Anne's Men in the years 1616–19; but it is not certain that Drew the actor, and Drue the playwright of The Duchess of Suffolk, were the same person.) Heywood is regarded as the best candidate for the author of Swetnam: "the language, dialogue, and clownery" of Swetnam are all typical of Heywood's style.

== Synopsis ==
The play is set in Sicily, where the royal court is a grim and somber place: King Atticus is mourning the death of his eldest son and heir, Lusippus, and the prolonged absence of his second son Lorenzo. In the middle of the opening scene, news arrives that Lorenzo is missing after fighting in the Battle of Lepanto (1571), and is feared to be either dead or captured by the Ottoman Turks.

The king also has a daughter, the beautiful and spirited Leonida. Yet Atticus is displeased with her: the scions of the great royal houses of Europe have come to seek her hand in marriage, but she has imperiously refused them all. The king calls her "wanton, coy, and fickle too;" he decides to punish her by restricting her social access, and puts her in the custody of his senior courtier, Nicanor. Nicanor quickly reveals himself to be both the play's villain and its senex: though an old man himself, he wants to marry Leonida and so become king after Atticus.

The second scene introduces Swetnam and his servant Swash, the play's clown. The conceit is that Swetnam has been driven out of England by the public's righteous indignation over his anti-female slanders; he has moved to Sicily and taken to calling himself Misogynos. (The play provides the earliest known use in English of the term "misogynist.") Once in Sicily, however, he has fallen back into his old habit of traducing women, and is becoming notorious in his new country just as he was in his old.

(The play's two opening scenes create an obvious conflict in chronology: the dramatist postulates a future, post-England Swetnam, but tosses him into 1570s Sicily. Yet such anomalies are only too common in English Renaissance drama. For extreme examples of historical anomalies and chronological conflict, see The Faithful Friends and The Old Law.)

Meanwhile, the missing prince, Lorenzo, has returned clandestinely to Sicily; he wants to spy out local conditions and corruptions, unhindered by his fame and high position. Only the loyal courtier Iago is aware of his presence.

Princess Leonida's current suitor is the prince of Naples, Lisandro; when Leonida is restricted from seeing him, he decides to take the bold step of masquerading as her confessor, Friar Anthony, to see her. His ardor and persistence create an impression on the young princess, and he wins her affection. But Nicanor catches the two of them together. The young couple are put on trial for violating the king's command; in the classic fairy tale tradition, the penalty they face is death. Yet at their trial, both of the accused accept blame for the infraction and exonerate the other. The judges complain to the king that they cannot decide; the king decrees that the matter will be resolved by a debate or disputation on the question of whether men or women are the morally weaker gender.

Swetnam/Misogynos is delighted to take the male side in the dispute; the women's side is taken by Lorenzo, who has disguised himself "like an Amazon." The debate is vigorous, and Lorenzo-alias-"Atlanta" does well; but the judges are all male, and Nicanor uses his corrupting influence to turn the outcome in Swetnam's favour. True to his word, Atticus condemns his daughter to death; Lisandro is sentenced to exile. In the aftermath of the debate, Swetnam surprisingly makes romantic advances to "Atlanta." To his servant Swash, Swetnam reveals that he is in the grip of lust rather than love; but the effect is highly comic all the same. In his pursuit of "Atlanta," Swetnam exposes himself to the revenge of the Sicilian women; they capture him, imprison him, and force him to recant and repent his bigotry against them.

The play takes a specific approach to Swetnam's bias, judging his low opinion of women as a reflection of his own low quality as a human being. As Iago puts it,

He's a man,
Whose breeding has been like the Scarrabee,
Altogether upon the excrement of the time;
And being swol'n with poisonous vapours
He breaks wind in public, to blast the
Reputation of all women; his acquaintance
Has been altogether amongst whores and bawds,
And therefore speaks but in's own element.
His own unworthy foul deformity,
Because no female can affect the same,
Begets in him despair; and despair, envy.
He cares not to defame their very souls,
But that he's of the Turk's opinion: they have none.

In the main plot, Lorenzo and Iago stage a pretended execution of Leonida. When Lisandro sees a mock-up of her supposedly severed head, he stabs himself in a suicide attempt; his guards, fearing punishment, flee, and Lorenzo and Iago secure his wounded body and nurse him back to health. In the play's final scene, the disaffected court party, including Lorenzo, Iago, Leonida and Lisandro, and Queen Aurelia, stage a masque on the theme of repentance; Atticus is affected, emotionally and psychologically, by the masque, and expresses his own repentance over his course of action. Once that change of heart has been achieved, Lorenzo, Leonida, and Lisandro can reveal themselves. Nicanor's villainy is exposed, and he too repents; in the spirit of the moment, the king forgives him, and urges him to "live honestly." Leonida and Lisandro can now engage to marry, and Lorenzo is the new crown prince.

[The play text presents interesting questions as to its original staging, like the mock severed head of Leonida. How was Lorenzo costumed as an "Amazon," and how did the audience interpret and understand his disguise?]

== Modern responses ==
The play's status as a pro-feminist, proto-feminist, or quasi-feminist text has earned it an ever-growing body of commentary, analysis, and criticism from modern scholars. Some attention has focused on the degree to which the play is or isn't a feminist work; critics have noted that Swetnam subordinates its polemical concerns to its subplot, while the main plot deals with high-flown romantic love.

The play was produced in 2004, in what is believed to be its US premiere, by the Airmid Theatre Company as part of the Play Outside festival in New York City.
