= Lenore Coffee =

American screenwriter and author (1896–1984)

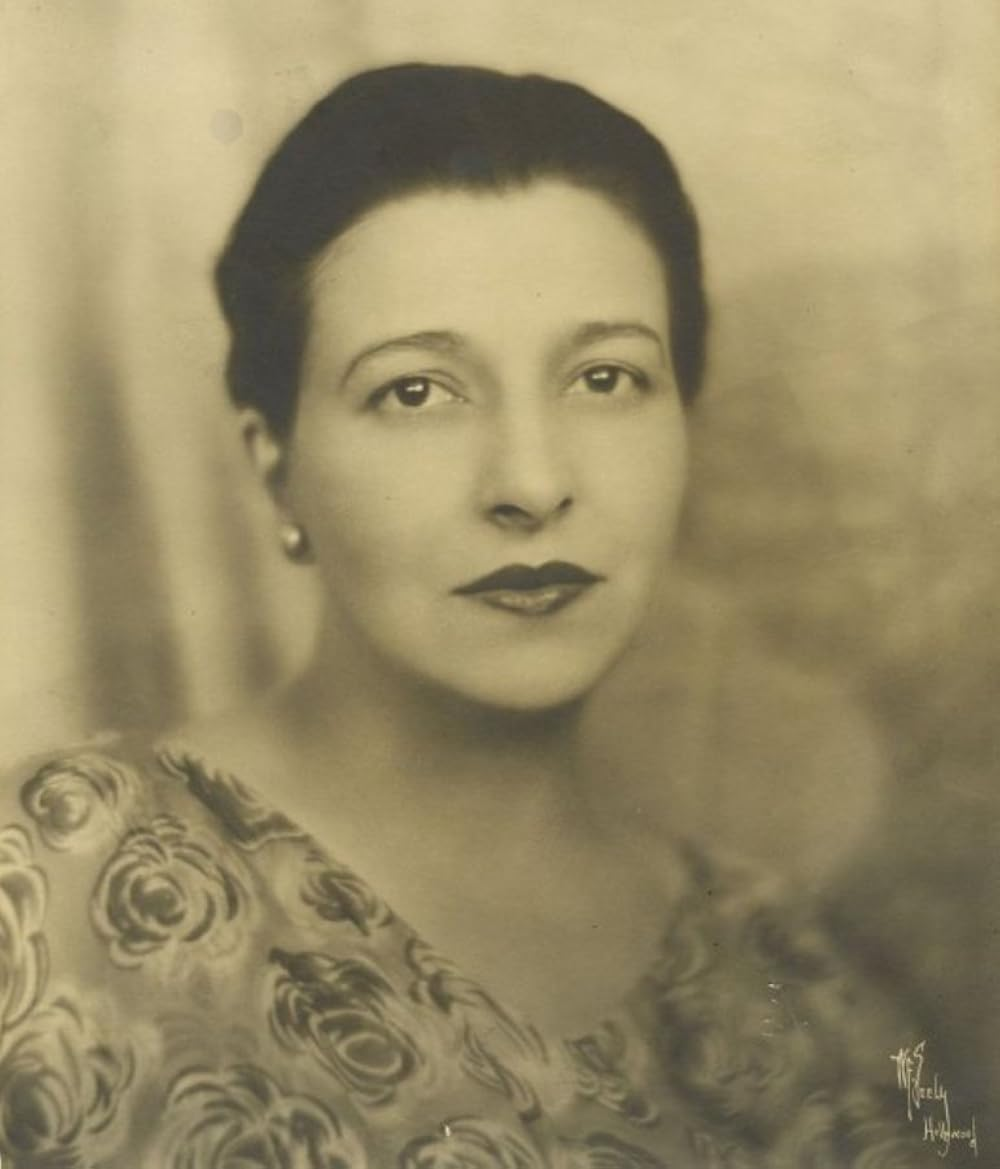
- Born: July 13, 1896; San Francisco, California, U.S.
- Died: July 2, 1984 (aged 87); Woodland Hills, Los Angeles, California, U.S.
- Occupations: Screenwriter; playwright; novelist
- Years active: 1918–1973
- Spouse: William J. Cowen (m. 1924; died 1964)
- Children: 2

Lenore Jackson Coffee (July 13, 1896 – July 2, 1984) was an American screenwriter, playwright, and novelist.

Born in San Francisco, in 1896, Lenore Coffee attended Dominican College in San Rafael, California. In 1918, she answered an ad in the Motion Pictures Herald Exhibitors, requesting a screen story for actress Clara Kimball Young. Coffee wrote a story treatment titled The Better Wife (1919), which was acquired by Harry Garson. He paid Coffee one hundred dollars and gave her screen credit. Garson soon hired her on a yearly contract, where she served as a continuity girl, assistant director, and made editing suggestions.

By 1920, Garson closed his studio, and Coffee found subsequent work in writing title cards and editing several films. In 1923, she was hired by Irving Thalberg, then working for Louis B. Mayer Pictures, to write title cards and adapt novels into scripts. A year later, Metro-Goldwyn-Mayer (MGM) was formed and Coffee continued her screenwriting career there. However, she left MGM after she had a salary dispute with Louis B. Mayer. Cecil B. DeMille later hired Coffee to write several films for him, including The Volga Boatman (1926). When sound films emerged, DeMille joined MGM and Coffee returned to writing numerous MGM films.

In 1937, Coffee left MGM again and wrote numerous scripts for Fox Film Corporation and Warner Bros. In 1939, she was jointly nominated for an Academy Award for Best Adapted Screenplay for Four Daughters (1938) alongside Julius J. Epstein. Meanwhile, Coffee co-wrote a play titled Family Portrait: A Play in Three Acts with her husband William J. Cowen. At Warner Bros., Coffee wrote several women's films, including The Great Lie (1941) and Old Acquaintance (1943).

By the 1950s, Coffee published her first novel Weep No More. It was retitled in the United States as Another Time, Another Place and adapted into a 1958 film starring Lana Turner. Coffee then relocated her family to England. After her husband's death in 1964, she returned to California and retired to the Motion Picture And Television Home in Woodland Hills. In 1984, Coffee died at the age of 87.

== Early life ==
Lenore Jackson Coffee was born in San Francisco in 1896 to Andrew Jackson Coffee Jr. and Ella Muffley. Her parents were frequent attendees for the Orpheum Theatre. She relates one story when her grandmother's maid (who was known as "'Old' Annie") became lost on their way to the Orpheum and arrived at the Alcazar. There, they saw the play Camille.

When Coffee was sixteen, she felt determined to become an actress. Her mother took her to a play, which starred Henry Miller. Coffee performed a monologue before Miller, who was seated on the front row of an empty theatre. Impressed, Miller asked her to join him to New York next April. By this time, Coffee was studying at the Dominican College in San Rafael, California. Her father arranged a deal, in which she would finish her last year in college first and then travel to New York. When the time arrived, her parents had divorced and her father felt she should pursue writing. When she was not interested, Coffee took her writings, tore the pages into pieces, and handed them to her father inside a cardboard box.

Disappointed at the lost opportunity, Coffee became interested in motion pictures. She wrote: "They took my mind off the theatre in one way, for the form was new, yet they satisfied the dramatic and emotional demands of my nature." She resumed her writing career and worked in advertising for a newspaper in Chinatown. She next worked as an assistant for the Emporium department store. There, she was asked to write a copy advertisement for the Sunday newspaper. Coffee stated, "I built the ad on the premise of how to dress well on a medium salary. I started out by saying, 'How would you like to buy a full wardrobe at the Emporium for $300? You'd think: Hopeless! And so it would be if it weren't for the Emporium'..." The next day, the ad caused an influx of customers. The store owner praised Coffee's ad and gave her a three-week vacation.

One day, she answered an advertisement in the Motion Pictures Herald Exhibitors, requesting a screen story for actress Clara Kimball Young. She submitted her original story treatment titled The Better Wife (1919) and was later paid $100 (equivalent to $2,140 in 2025). She also requested through telegraph to be given screen credit. In March 1918, she introduced herself to Harry Garson at the St. Francis Hotel. There, she was hired on a one-year contract at $50 a week. The film was released in 1919, which premiered at the Criterion Theatre.

== Career ==
=== 1919–1920: Writing for Harry Garson ===
Coffee relocated to Los Angeles. By the time she arrived, Garson and Young had left for New York. She was instead taken to Louis B. Mayer Pictures, where its namesake founder dropped her weekly salary to $30 a week. She was hired to review the studio's optioned properties and selected the appropriate titles to be adapted into films. She selected a novel titled The Fighting Shepherdess, intended for Anita Stewart. After eight weeks, Coffee received a call from Garson requesting her availability. Because Mayer was unavailable, she explained the situation to his assistant Benny Zeidman. She left and reported back to Garson and was given her back pay.

At Garson's studio, she was hired in a position known today as a script supervisor (also called the "continuity girl") where she read the fan mail for Clara Kimball Young, submitted original stories, made editing notes, and wrote screen title cards. There, her first work was for Eyes of Youth (1919), in which she contributed editorial suggestions. She wrote: "I became so interested in production details that I began, on my own, to make cutting notes. For example, when the director called to the cameraman for a close-up, I would make a note of where he intended it to be used in the picture."

Coffee wrote her second story for The Forbidden Woman (1920), with Young and Conway Tearle in the leading roles. Two days were spent filming on location in San Francisco, with the remainder shot in studio. Coffee next co-wrote the story for Hush (1921) with Sada Cowan. In 1920, Garson purchased the screen rights to the play Mid-channel by Arthur Wing Pinero. An English director had been fired due to creative differences and Garson became the new director. During filming, Garson feuded with an assistant director who did not understand his instructions. The assistant director was also fired, and Coffee was promptly hired to take his place. Her responsibility involved script breakdown for the various departments during the production, including the actors.

=== 1920–1923: Titling and editing jobs ===
"This was very fortunate of me, because later on I became something of an expert on editing and titling what were called 'sick' pictures that were lying on the shelf, not fit to be released. I called these my 'rescue' jobs, for with ingenious rearranging of the order of scenes or whole episodes, and new subtitles, they could very often be salvaged."

— Coffee

After Mid-Channel (1920) was released, Garson decided to close his studio and moved to the East Coast for more financing. Sometime later, Louis Anger hired Coffee after a friend had recommended her to write title cards and re-edit two films. She was hired at her proposed salary of $1,000 on each film. Within ten days, she had reassembled a rough cut and screened it to Anger and Lew Cody. Both men were pleased and made further suggestions. Coffee restructured the second film and had the actors return for iris shots, which she directed.

Following this job, Coffee was approached by Sam Roark to write title cards and edit six films, starring Australian actor Snowy Baker. The editing job was done at Colonel Selig's Zoo. There, Coffee received a message to see Irving Thalberg in his office at Universal Studios. Thalberg offered to hire her on a yearly contract for $200 a week to write film scenarios. By then, Coffee had only written original stories. Meanwhile, she received a counteroffer from Metro Pictures, with a proposed salary of $250 a week. She informed Thalberg she had accepted Metro Pictures' offer.

At Metro Pictures, Coffee spent two years working with playwright Bayard Veiller, which she considered as her apprenticeship as a scenarist. During her time there, Roscoe Arbuckle had been accused of rape and manslaughter, which indirectly caused the formation of the Motion Production Code. By winter 1921, Coffee handed her first completed script to Veiller, with Bert Lydell intended to star. She and Veiller made further revisions, which included polishing the dialogue. However, Metro Pictures foreclosed and Veiller moved back to New York. With one year left on her contract, Coffee relocated to New York with Veiller and Lydell.

In New York, she stayed there for three years. She worked as a playwright and was later paid six times her starting salary. Coffee was approached by Max Karger, the former financial head of Metro Pictures, and was given a three-picture deal in Hollywood. Karger left on a train to Hollywood, but Coffee stayed behind. She went to the Ambassador Hotel and met Thomas Ince. He wanted her to write a script for him, but she informed Ince that Karger had already hired her. However, Karger was found dead from a heart attack on a train.

With her contract now void, Coffee signed a six-week contract with Ince and worked on a story acquired by Parker Reid. In Pasadena, she clashed with Clark Thomas, the studio production manager, whom Coffee claimed, resented her hiring. Her contract expired and her job was left unfinished. Afterwards, Irving Thalberg, now working for Mayer Pictures, hired her to write title cards for John Stahl's The Dangerous Age, which starred Lewis Stone and Florence Vidor.

By 1923, Coffee wrote the scenario for Daytime Wives and was again involved in the editing. She also wrote the first script draft for the 1926 film adaptation of The Winning of Barbara Worth, though Frances Marion received the film's sole writing credit.

=== 1924: Career at MGM ===
In the spring of 1924, Coffee collaborated with Thalberg, his assistant Paul Bern, Bess Meredyth, and director Fred Niblo on a script adaptation of Captain Applejack. In April of the same year, Metro Studios (then owned by Loews Theatres), Goldwyn Studios, and Louis B. Mayer Pictures merged to form a conglomerate studio known as Metro-Goldwyn-Mayer (MGM).

Relocated in Culver City, Thalberg employed as many as 108 screenwriters so he would not have to borrow them from a rival studio. After the merger, Thalberg requested Coffee's opinion on the script for The Great Divide (1925). She recommended Norma Shearer for the lead female role, but Thalberg disagreed stating: "Impossible. No one would believe that she would allow herself to be raped, in any circumstances. She looks too well able to take care of herself." Alice Terry was cast instead.

In 1924, Coffee married William J. Cowen. When she returned from her honeymoon, Coffee wrote a story outline titled Stepmother and submitted it to Harry Rapf. He liked the story, though he was reluctant to pay her the $5,000 salary she requested. The next day, Mayer called her into his studio office. There, he harshly scolded her to accept a $2,500 salary or "get the hell out of the studio." Coffee declined to take a lower salary, in which Mayer called her a "cold, selfish, mercenary, unscrupulous woman." Offended, she packed her belongings and left the studio lot.

=== 1924–1928: Working for Cecil B. DeMille ===
During her honeymoon, Coffee learned that Paramount Pictures had acquired the screen rights to Ferenc Molnár's 1920 play The Swan, with Dimitri Buchowetzki to direct. The Swan (1925) went into production at Paramount with Clare Eames as Alexandra, but she was deemed too mature for the role after a few days of filming. She was replaced by Frances Howard, who later became the second wife of producer Samuel Goldwyn. Months after she left MGM, Coffee was asked by Fox Film Corporation to write the script for East Lynne (1925). She wrote: "It was a terribly old-fashioned story but I was so glad to be at work again that I took it."

By December 1924, Coffee had heard discussions of a potential film remake of Graustark (1915). She wrote a treatment and sold it to First National Pictures for $1,500 (equivalent to $28,180 in 2025). During filming, DeMille Pictures Corp. asked Coffee to attend a story conference, which concerned Hell's Highroad (1925) starring Leatrice Joy which was to begin shooting. By this point, Coffee had been discontented with "rescue jobs," but nevertheless arrived at the studio. Inside the conference room, she was greeted by several individuals including Cecil B. DeMille and his screenwriting collaborator Jeanie MacPherson.

At DeMille Pictures Corp., Coffee became friends with actress Leatrice Joy and later became a godmother to her child. She wrote two original scripts for Joy, one of them was For Alimony Only (1926). DeMille asked Coffee to adapt Konrad Bercovici's novel The Volga Boatman into a treatment. Bercovici had written an outline, but he left the production because of personal issues. As was typical, DeMille shot his films in continuity after they screened the dailies that had been filmed on the previous day. For DeMille's next film, he considered a film about Judas Iscariot titled Thirty Pieces of Silver. He decided instead to film The King of Kings (1927), and asked Coffee to write the scenario. However, she declined because she felt H. B. Warner (at the time, 50 years old) was miscast as Jesus; Jeanie Macpherson was selected instead.

By 1926, Coffee became pregnant with her first child. She notified DeMille and he allowed her to work from home. There, Samuel Goldwyn called her, having received DeMille's permission, and requested Coffee's input on The Night of Love (1927), which was set to star Ronald Colman and Vilma Bánky. Goldwyn arrived at her residence and explained the film's opening act. Coffee suggested he incorporate the medieval practice droit du seigneur into the script to strengthen the characters' motivations. With DeMille's extended permission, Coffee rewrote the scenario with director George Fitzmaurice in less than three weeks.

After she had given birth, Coffee and her husband attended a performance of the 1926 play Chicago. Coffee deeply admired the play and alerted DeMille, who was editing The King of Kings, about it. Within a year, DeMille produced a film adaptation of the play. In 1927, Warner Bros. released The Jazz Singer and within two years, Hollywood had transitioned into sound films. DeMille closed his studio and signed a co-production deal with MGM. On the studio lot, Louis B. Mayer exclaimed to Coffee: "So you had to come home!"

=== 1929–1937: Return to MGM ===
With DeMille at MGM, Coffee's contract was renegotiated with a new 30-day mutual closing notice. Her first screenplay with dialogue was the 1929 film The Bishop Murder Case. She noted: "I liked the assignment and found that I loved writing dialogue, and from that day on no ever wrote one word of dialogue for me." Coffee took another maternity leave and gave birth to a son. Back at MGM, she wrote the script adaptation of the 1930 novel Mothers Cry.

Shortly after, Universal Pictures hired Coffee to write a script for John Stahl. Unhappy with her assignment, DeMille asked her to rewrite the script for The Squaw Man (1931). Elsie Janis had written a draft, but DeMille felt it lacked structure. Back at MGM, DeMille then raised her salary to $1,000 a week (equivalent to $19,273 in 2025). Sometime later, DeMille was hospitalized for an appendix operation; he later left MGM and joined Paramount Pictures.

By New Year's Day 1931, Coffee had to decline an offer from Samuel Goldwyn as she decided to stay at MGM, though Thalberg slashed her weekly salary in half. Thalberg assigned her to adapt the 1920 play The Mirage into a vehicle for Joan Crawford. Retitled Possessed (1931), Clarence Brown directed the film. Coffee reunited with Bayard Veiller on the 1932 crime film Night Court. After this, the two rewrote Carey Wilson's script for Arsène Lupin (1932). Despite her objections, Wilson's writing credit was retained.

In 1928, actor John Gilbert had written an original story for a proposed silent film. Four years later, Thalberg revived the project as a sound film, and assigned Coffee to write the script, with Monta Bell to direct. The film was titled Downstairs (1932). Sometime later, Coffee left MGM after several loan-out requests from competing studios had been turned down by Thalberg and Samuel Marx, MGM's head of screenwriting department. According to Coffee's account, she sent a letter listing potential film adaptations, including a remake of Camille with Greta Garbo on Thalberg's office. She then phoned DeMille about her salary cuts. DeMille recommended she hire a talent agent, in which Coffee hired Phil Berg.

At Paramount Pictures, Berg brokered a three-picture deal for Coffee with her salary at $1,000 a week; her first project was rewriting the script for Torch Singer (1933), which starred Claudette Colbert. When her deal expired, Coffee returned to Fox Film Corporation to adapt All Men Are Enemies (1934), which had been based on the novel by Richard Aldington. Berg signed Coffee to another tenureship at MGM on a year's contract. There, she adapted the 1933 novel Vanessa by Hugh Walpole into a screenplay. The script was submitted for approval by the Production Code Administration (PCA), then headed by Joseph Breen. He objected to the characters' sexual immorality, which had to be rewritten for approval. Coffee then adapted Evelyn Prentice (1934), which starred William Powell and Myrna Loy.

By 1935, her contract had expired, but MGM gave her a two-year extension. Coffee took a leave of absence and toured Europe. When she returned, she learned that David O. Selznick was leaving MGM and wanted to buy out Coffee's contract, which MGM refused. In 1937, Coffee approached Eddie Mannix about her assignments. Mannix gave her The Rage of Paris script, which was set to star Jean Harlow. However, Harlow died on June 7, 1937 and the project was shelved. Coffee's extended contract expired and she signed with Warner Bros, though she returned to MGM after several intervals.

=== 1938–1943: Warner Bros. ===
At Warner Bros, Coffee held a studio office, though she frequently wrote from home. She subsequently co-wrote the script for Four Daughters (1938) with Julius J. Epstein, adapted from the 1937 story "Sister Act" by Fannie Hurst. At the 1939 Academy Awards, Coffee and Epstein were nominated for an Academy Award for Best Adapted Screenplay. Despite their joint screenplay credit, Coffee stated she had never met Epstein.

=== 1939–1973: Playwright and author ===
In 1939, Coffee co-wrote the play Family Portrait: A Play in Three Acts with her husband William J. Cowen. The play detailed the life of Jesus through the eyes of his immediate family. It opened at the Morosco Theatre, and starred Judith Anderson as Mary, mother of Jesus. In his theatre review, Brooks Atkinson of The New York Times praised Anderson's performance but felt "the inadequacy of the writing is something to mourn." The play was performed at the Strand Theatre in the West End, in February 1948.

In 1955, Coffee published the novel Weep No More. It was retitled in the United States as Another Time, Another Place. In an interview with the Los Angeles Times, Coffee stated she wrote the novel to "try and show that a woman can be a career woman with lots of brains and have no sense." The novel was adapted into a 1958 film with the American title, starring Lana Turner. Decades later, she reflected negatively on the film, stating, "It stunk. It was just dreadful." In 1959, at the behest of her husband, Coffee and her family relocated to England where she enrolled her children at the Bristol Old Vic Theatre School.

In 1973, Coffee published her memoir Storyline. The book focused on her career during the last ten years of the silent film era (1919–1929) and her career as an in-demand script doctor for MGM. While she praised those years, Coffee quoted Samuel Hoffenstein on their reflection the Hollywood studio system: "They pick your brains, break your heart, ruin your digestion—and what do you get for it? Nothing but a lousy fortune!"

== Personal life ==
In 1922, Coffee met William J. Cowen (1886–1964), a writer and director, at a beach while she was working for William Ince. She married Cowen on June 8, 1924. The two had a daughter, Sabina, and a son, Garry.

In 1981, Coffee returned to the United States to live in retirement at the Motion Picture And Television Home in Woodland Hills, California. On July 2, 1984, she died at a nearby hospital, at age 87.

== Filmography ==
Year	Title	Director	Credits	Refs
1919	The Better Wife	William P. S. Earle	Story	
1920	The Forbidden Woman	Harry Garson	Story	
1920	For the Soul of Rafael	Harry Garson	Uncredited	
1920	The Fighting Shepherdess	Edward José	Uncredited	
1921	Alias Ladyfingers	Bayard Veiller	Adaptation	
1921	Hush	Harry Garson	Uncredited	
1922	The Face Between	Bayard Veiller	Adaptation	
1922	The Right That Failed	Bayard Veiller	Adaptation	
1922	Sherlock Brown	Bayard Veiller	Scenario	
1923	The Dangerous Age	John M. Stahl	Uncredited	
1923	Daytime Wives	Emile Chautard	Co-story	
1923	The Six-Fifty	Nat Ross	Co-script	
1923	Temptation	Edward J. LeSaint	Story	
1923	Thundering Dawn	Harry Garson	Co-script	
1923	The Age of Desire	Frank Borzage	Titles	
1923	Wandering Daughters	James Young	Titles	
1923	Strangers of the Night	Fred Niblo	Uncredited	
1924	Bread	Victor Schertzinger	Adaptation	
1924	Fool's Highway	Irving Cummings	Co-script	
1924	The Rose of Paris	Irving Cummings	Adaptation	
1925	East Lynne	Emmett Flynn	Co-adaptation	
1925	Hell's Highroad	Rupert Julian	Co-adaptation	
1925	Graustark	Dimitri Buchowetzki	Uncredited	
1925	The Great Divide	Reginald Barker	Uncredited	
1925	The Swan	Dimitri Buchowetzki	Uncredited	
1926	For Alimony Only	William DeMille	Story contribution	
1926	The Volga Boatman	Cecil DeMille	Adaptation	
1926	The Winning of Barbara Worth	Henry King	Uncredited	
1927	The Angel of Broadway	Lois Weber	Story / Scenarist	
1927	Chicago	Frank Urson	Adaptation	
1927	Lonesome Ladies	Joseph Henabery	Story	
1927	The Night of Love	George Fitzmaurice	Adaptation	
1927	The Love of Sunya	Albert Parker	Uncredited	
1928	Desert Nights	William Nigh	Co-script	
1928	Ned McCobb's Daughter	William J. Cowen	Uncredited	
1930	The Bishop Murder Case	Nick Grinde	Adaptation; Dialogue continuity	
1930	Mothers Cry	Hobart Henley	Adaptation; Additional dialogue	
1930	Street of Chance	John Cromwell	Dialogue	
1931	Possessed	Clarence Brown	Adaptation; Dialogue contribution	
1931	The Squaw Man	Cecil B. DeMille	Co-script	
1932	Arsène Lupin	Jack Conway	Dialogue by	
1932	Night Court	W. S. Van Dyke	Script by	
1932	Downstairs	Monta Bell	Script	
1932	Rasputin and the Empress	Richard Boleslawski	Uncredited	
1933	Torch Singer	Alexander Hall; George Somnes	Script by Dialogue by	
1934	All Men Are Enemies	George Fitzmaurice	Script by	
1934	Four Frightened People	Cecil B. DeMille	Script by	
1934	Such Women Are Dangerous	James Flood	Additional dialogue	
1934	Evelyn Prentice	William K. Howard	Script by	
1935	Vanessa: Her Love Story	William K. Howard	Adaptation	
1935	David Copperfield	George Cukor	Uncredited	
1935	Age of Indiscretion	Edward Ludwig	Story	
1936	Suzy	George Fitzmaurice	Script by	
1937	Parnell	John M. Stahl	Uncredited	
1938	White Banners	Edmund Goulding	Screenplay	
1938	Four Daughters	Michael Curtiz	Screenplay by Nominated for Academy Award for Best Adapted Screenplay	
1939	Good Girls Go to Paris	Alexander Hall	Story	
1940	My Son, My Son!	Charles Vidor	Screenplay by	
1940	The Way of All Flesh	Louis King	Screenplay by	
1941	They Died with Their Boots On	Raoul Walsh	Additional dialogue Uncredited	
1941	The Great Lie	Edmund Goulding	Screenplay by	
1942	We Were Dancing	Robert Z. Leonard	Uncredited	
1942	The Gay Sisters	Irving Rapper	Screenplay by	
1943	Old Acquaintance	Vincent Sherman	Screenplay by	
1944	Till We Meet Again	Frank Borzage	Screenplay by	
1944	Marriage Is a Private Affair	Robert Z. Leonard	Story and screenplay by	
1946	Tomorrow Is Forever	Irving Pichel	Screenplay by	
1947	The Guilt of Janet Ames	Henry Levin	Screen story by	
1947	Escape Me Never	Peter Godfrey	Uncredited	
1949	Beyond the Forest	King Vidor	Screenplay by	
1951	Lightning Strikes Twice	King Vidor	Screenplay by	
1952	Sudden Fear	David Miller	Screenplay by	
1954	Young at Heart	Gordon Douglas	Remake of Four Daughters	
1955	The End of the Affair	Edward Dmytryk	Screenplay by	
1955	Footsteps in the Fog	Arthur Lubin	Screenplay by	
1958	Another Time, Another Place	Lewis Allen	Adapted from novel by	
1960	Cash McCall	Joseph Pevney	Screenplay by	

== Publications ==
- Family Portrait: A Play in Three Acts. 1939.
- Weep No More (Novel). 1955. (later adapted into the 1958 film Another Time, Another Place)
- The Face of Love (Novel). New York, Crown Publishers. 1959.
- The Eye of Memory (Novel). Aylesbury: Milton House Books. 1973. ISBN 978-0-859-40011-4.

== Bibliography ==
- Coffee, Lenore (1973). Storyline: Recollections of a Hollywood Screenwriter (Memoir). London: Cassell. ISBN 0-304-29245-1.
- McGilligan, Patrick, ed. (1986). "Lenore Coffee: Easy Smiler, Easy Weeper". Backstory: Interviews with Screenwriters of Hollywood's Golden Age. Berkeley: University of California Press. pp. 133–150.
- Casella, Donna (2017). "Shaping the Craft of Screenwriting: Women Screen Writers in Silent Era Hollywood". Women Film Pioneers Project. Columbia University.
