= Angers (surname) =

Angers is a surname. Notable people with the surname include:

- Auguste-Réal Angers (1837–1919), Canadian judge
- Avril Angers (1918–2005), English actress
- François M. Angers (21st century), Canadian judge
- François-Albert Angers (1909–2003), Canadian economist
- François-Réal Angers (1812–1860), Canadian lawyer
- Louis Charles Alphonse Angers (1854–1929), Canadian politician
- Michel Angers (born 1959), Canadian politician

== See also ==
- Albinus of Angers (c. 470 – 550), French abbot and bishop
