= James H. Speer =

American geographer and geologist

James H. Speer (born 1971) is a professor of geography and geology at Indiana State University. He is a past president of the Tree-Ring Society and the Geography Educator's Network of Indiana. He has been the organizer for the North American Dendroecological Fieldweek (NADEF) since 2003.

== Education ==
Speer received his bachelor's and master's degree in geosciences from the University of Arizona and his PhD from the University of Tennessee in geography.

== Recognition ==
He received the Henry Cowles award from the American Association of Geographers (with Thomas W. Swetnam) for their paper on Pandora moth outbreaks in 2002. In 2008, he received the Richard L. Holmes Outstanding Service to Dendrochronology award from the Tree-Ring Society. He received the William E. Bennett Award for Extraordinary Contributions to Citizen Science from the National Center for Science and Civic Engagement in 2011. He received the Henry Cowles award from the American Association of Geographers a second time for his book Fundamentals of Tree-Ring Research published with the University of Arizona Press. He received the Dreiser Distinguished Research/Creativity Award at Indiana State University in 2017.

== Research ==
He has authored and co-authored more than 40 scientific papers. His most cited papers are:

- Clark, P. W.; Speer, J. H.; Winship, L. J. (2017). "Identifying and Separating Climate and Pandora Moth Outbreaks from A 1,500-Year Long Ponderosa Pine Chronology from Central Oregon". Tree-Ring Research. 73 (2): 113–125. doi:10.3959/1536-1098-73.2.113. S2CID 134275907.
- Speer, J. H.; Grissino-Mayer, H. D.; Orvis, K. H.; Greenberg, K. (2009). "Climate Response of Five Oak Species in the Eastern Deciduous Forest of the Southern Appalachian Mountains, U.S.A.". Canadian Journal of Forest Research. 39 (3): 507–518. doi:10.1139/X08-194.
- Speer, J. H.; Orvis, K. H.; Grissino-Mayer, H. D.; Kennedy, L.M.; Horn, S. P. (2004). "Assessing the Dendrochronological Potential of Pinus occidentalis Swartz in the Cordillera Central of the Dominican Republic". The Holocene. 14 (4): 563–569. Bibcode:2004Holoc..14..563S. doi:10.1191/0959683604hl732rp. S2CID 129647313.
- Speer, J. H.; Swetnam, T. W.; Wickman, B. E.; Youngblood, A. (2001). "Changes in Pandora Moth Outbreak Dynamics During the Past 622 years". Ecology. 82 (3): 679–697. doi:10.1890/0012-9658(2001)082[0679:CIPMOD]2.0.CO;2.
