= Anger (disambiguation) =

Anger is an emotion.

Anger may also refer to:

== Places ==
- Anger, Bavaria, a town in Germany
- Anger, Austria, a town in Styria, Austria
- Anger (river), in France

== People ==
- Anger (surname)

== Film and TV ==
- Anger (film), a 2016 Japanese film
- Anger, a character in the film Inside Out

== Music ==
- Anger (album), a 1986 album by Sandy Lam
- "Anger", a 1979 single by Marvin Gaye from Here, My Dear
- "Anger" (downset. song), originally called "Social Justice"
- "Anger", a song from Cleanse Fold and Manipulate by Skinny Puppy

== Other uses ==
- Gamma camera, also called an Anger camera

== See also ==
- St. Anger, a studio album by Metallica
- Angers (disambiguation)
- Agner (disambiguation)
- Angry (disambiguation)
