= Angers (disambiguation) =

Angers is a city in the Maine-et-Loire department in western France.

Angers may also refer to:

== Places ==
- Angers, Masson-Angers, Gatineau, Quebec, Canada
- Arrondissement of Angers, Maine-et-Loire department, France
  - Angers – Loire Airport

== Rivers ==
- Bras des Angers, Quebec, Canada
- Angers River, Quebec, Canada

== Other uses ==
- Angers SCO, a French football club
- Angers (meteorite), that hit France in 1822
- Angers (surname), including a list of people with the name

== See also ==
- Anger (disambiguation)
