= Edward Knight (King's Men) =

Edward Knight (fl. 1613 – 1637) was the prompter (then called the "book-keeper" or "book-holder") of the King's Men, the acting company that performed the plays of William Shakespeare, Ben Jonson, John Fletcher, and other playwrights of Jacobean and Caroline drama.

In English Renaissance theatre, the prompter managed the company's performances, ensuring that they went according to plan; he also supervised and maintained the troupe's dramatic manuscripts, its "playbooks." It was in this sense that the prompter "held" and "kept" the "books" of the company. And when censorship problems arose, the prompter had to resolve them.

Nothing is known of Knight's personal history; he is known only through his professional activities. Prior to his service with the King's Men, he functioned as a prompter for a competing company, Prince Charles's Men; he witnessed a contract between Philip Henslowe and the actors in March 1616. After some years with the King's Men, he was apparently regarded as a key member of the company's supporting staff: on 27 December 1624, Sir Henry Herbert, the Master of the Revels, issued a roster of 21 "musicians and other necessary attendants" of the King's Men who could not be arrested or "pressed for soldiers" without the permission of either Herbert or the Lord Chamberlain, then William Herbert, 3rd Earl of Pembroke. Knight's name is first on the list. (The 16th name on the list is Anthony Knight, perhaps a relative.)

Knight prepared the company's play texts for production, adding stage directions, cues for offstage sounds, and other necessary information to turn an author's or scribe's manuscript into a promptbook. Several play manuscripts in Knight's hand survive – for Bonduca, The Faithful Friends, and The Honest Man's Fortune. (Knight's manuscript for Bonduca is not a promptbook but a presentation MS. In the MSS. of both Bonduca and The Fautfhul Friends, Knight leaves gaps because he is transcribing the author's drafts, the "foul papers," and sometimes cannot read the defective texts.) Knight's job of annotating manuscripts for use as promptbooks throws light on practical aspects of the stagecraft of the era, and also the censorship problems that plagued the dramatists and actors. Philip Massinger's authorial MS. of his Believe as You List reveals official censorship in action, and bears notes and revisions in Knight's hand.

(In the Believe as You List MS., Knight marked the actors' entrances three or four lines prior to their first speaking; they needed the time to traverse the large stage of the Globe Theatre.)

A second document from the hand of Sir Henry Herbert, addressed personally to Knight, is especially notable. On 21 October 1633, Herbert returned the MS. of The Woman's Prize to Knight, ordering him to do a better job of removing "oaths, prophaness, and publique ribaldrye", and threatening Knight with consequences if he doesn't do better: "you will answer it at your perill."

Shakespeare scholars have devoted a good measure of attention to the specifics of Knight's practice and his handwriting, looking for insight into the effect Knight may have had on the details of Shakespeare's texts. "The 1634 Quarto of Two Noble Kinsmen, printed from a manuscript which apparently reflects a revival of 1625/6, contains stage directions probably penned by Knight." At the extreme, it has been suggested that Knight was "the virtual editor of the First Folio on behalf of Heminge and Condell."

(The censored manuscript of the Fletcher/Massinger collaboration Sir John van Olden Barnavelt contains prompter's notes, but they are not in Knight's hand. The King's Men had another prompter in Knight's era, a man named Thomas Vincent; even less is known about Vincent than about Knight.)
