= The Great Lie =

1941 film by Edmund Goulding

- Theatrical release poster
- Directed by: Edmund Goulding
- Screenplay by: Lenore J. Coffee
- Based on: January Heights; 1936 novel by Polan Banks
- Produced by: Hal B. Wallis (executive producer)
- Starring: Bette Davis; George Brent; Mary Astor
- Cinematography: Tony Gaudio
- Edited by: Ralph Dawson
- Music by: Max Steiner
- Production company: Warner Bros. Pictures
- Distributed by: Warner Bros. Pictures
- Release date: April 12, 1941
- Running time: 108 minutes
- Country: United States
- Language: English
- Budget: $689,253

The Great Lie is a 1941 American drama film directed by Edmund Goulding, and starring Bette Davis, George Brent and Mary Astor. The screenplay by Lenore J. Coffee is based on the novel January Heights by Polan Banks.

== Plot ==
When concert pianist Sandra Kovak (Mary Astor) and her aviator husband Peter Van Allen (George Brent) discover their impulsive marriage is invalid because her divorce had not been finalized before they wed, he leaves her and marries his old flame Maggie Patterson (Bette Davis). Peter travels to Brazil on business and, when his aircraft goes missing, it is presumed it crashed in the jungle and he was killed.

Sandra discovers she is pregnant by Peter. Maggie proposes she be allowed to raise the child as her own in exchange for taking care of Sandra financially. The two women go to Arizona to await the birth, and Sandra delivers a boy, who is named after his father.

Sandra embarks upon a world tour, during which Peter, who survived the crash, returns home. He reunites with Maggie who introduces him to "their" son. Peter is overjoyed to find he has a child. However, Sandra, wanting both father and son for herself, taunts Maggie that Peter has remained with her only because of the boy and demands she confess she misled him. When Maggie explains the true situation, Peter is shocked and disgusted by Sandra's horrid behavior and announces she may take the baby but he will remain with Maggie. Sandra, accepting that Peter truly loves Maggie and knowing Maggie will be a far better mother to the child, sits down at the piano and announces she is leaving the child with his mother as she plays Tchaikovsky's Piano Concerto No. 1.

== Cast ==
- Bette Davis as Maggie Patterson
- George Brent as Peter Van Allen
- Mary Astor as Sandra Kovak
- Lucile Watson as Aunt Ada Greenfield
- Hattie McDaniel as Violet
- Grant Mitchell as Joshua Mason
- Jerome Cowan as Jock Thompson
- Charles Trowbridge as Sen. Ted Greenfield
- Thurston Hall as Oscar Worthington James
- Russell Hicks as Colonel Harriston
- J. Farrell MacDonald as Dr. Ferguson
- Sam McDaniel as Jefferson

== Production ==
After completing The Letter, Bette Davis vacationed in New Hampshire, and upon her return to Hollywood she was offered the role of Maggie Peterson in The Great Lie. "I wasn't very excited about it," she later recalled, but fan mail urging her to play a nice role for a change of pace prompted her to accept. "Maggie was one of the few times I played a character basically like myself off the screen," she said. The chance to play a sympathetic character was appealing because fan mail had been universally calling for her to be "nice."

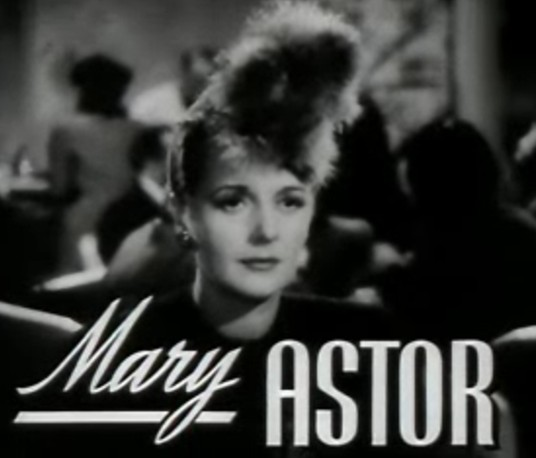
From the film's trailer

The role of Sandra Kovak proved difficult to cast. Although she was ideal for the part, Miriam Hopkins was not considered because of the many problems she had created while co-starring with Davis in The Old Maid. Among those who tested for the part were Anna Sten, Sylvia Sidney, Muriel Angelus, Katherine Locke, and Mary Astor, who was, in fact, an accomplished pianist.

Davis, who enjoyed working with powerful actresses capable of challenging her to outmatch them in scenes in which they interacted, felt Astor was the best of the lot and insisted studio head Jack L. Warner test her again, this time playing the piano, when producer Hal B. Wallis seemed disinclined to offer her the role.

Filming began with the role of Sandra still uncast, much to Davis' distress. She and director Edmund Goulding engaged in so many heated discussions the actress developed laryngitis, and filming was suspended for two days. When Davis returned to the set on November 8, 1940, she learned Wallis and Warner had acquiesced to her demand that Astor be cast.

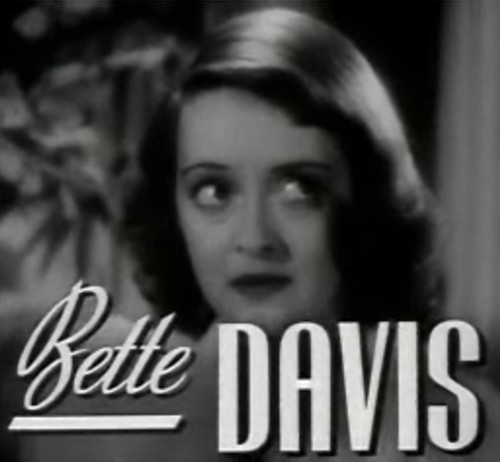
From the film's trailer

Davis and Astor bonded immediately. "This picture is going to stink! It's too incredible for words... so it's up to us to rewrite this piece of junk to make it more interesting," Davis told her co-star, and the two women set about to eliminate many of the soap opera elements from their dialogue and create a great deal of business for their characters.

Still, there were some problems the two could neither anticipate nor avoid. The baby hired to play the infant Peter was sick during much of the filming, causing delays in the schedule, and when a nurse dropped him, he was injured so seriously he needed to be replaced. (His parents consequently filed a lawsuit against the studio.) Davis, Astor and George Brent, cast as Peter Van Allen, also were ill at various times, creating problems with the schedule. Additionally, Astor was distracted by marital problems with Manuel del Campo, who refused to join her on location in Victorville, California after she was given permission for him to do so. Davis was determined filming be completed by Christmas so the cast and crew could enjoy the holidays and she could plan her New Year's Eve wedding with Arthur Farnsworth.

Although Astor was capable enough to play the piano during the concert sequences, her instrument was a dummy while Max Rabinovitch was playing a real one behind the scenes. Taking her cues from the conductor, the actress matched notes with the pianist until perfect synchronization was achieved. Jose Iturbi later asked Astor, "How could you not be playing? I have played the concerto many times, and you were right in there!" Davis stated, "These concert scenes of Mary's were the most believable ever seen on screen - because she really was a pianist par excellence."

At Davis' request, the film premiered in Littleton, New Hampshire on April 5, 1941, her 33rd birthday, as a benefit for the local hospital. It opened nationwide the following week. On March 2, 1942, Brent and Astor reprised their roles for a Lux Radio Theatre broadcast, with Loretta Young assuming the Davis role.

== Reception ==
Bosley Crowther of The New York Times observed, "There is precious little substance to this elaborately surcharged dilemma in which Miss Davis has been caught up... So the only excuse to be found for this thoroughly synthetic tale is that it gives Miss Davis an opportunity to display her fine talent for distress, to be maternal and noble... And in that role there is no question that she conducts herself handsomely... Mary Astor... provides a beautiful contrast of cold and poisonous conceit... In short, the acting is impressive, the direction of Edmund Goulding makes for class, but the story is such a trifle that it hardly seems worth the while. However, the women will probably love it, since fibs are so provocative of fun."

Variety called the film "a well-rounded package of dramatic entertainment" due to "excellent performances by the players, deft direction by Edmund Goulding, and a compact script by Lenore Coffee."

== Awards and nominations ==
Astor won the Academy Award for Best Supporting Actress.

== Home media ==
On April 1, 2008, Warner Home Video released the film in DVD format as part of the box set The Bette Davis Collection, Volume 3, which also includes All This, and Heaven Too, In This Our Life, Watch on the Rhine and Deception.
