= All Men Are Enemies =

1934 film by George Fitzmaurice

- Directed by: George Fitzmaurice
- Screenplay by: Lenore J. Coffee
- Based on: All Men Are Enemies by Richard Aldington
- Produced by: Al Rockett
- Starring: Helen Twelvetrees; Mona Barrie; Hugh Williams; Herbert Mundin; Henry Stephenson; Walter Byron
- Cinematography: John F. Seitz
- Edited by: Harold D. Schuster
- Music by: Louis De Francesco
- Production company: Fox Film Corporation
- Distributed by: Fox Film Corporation
- Release date: April 20, 1934
- Running time: 78 minutes
- Country: United States
- Language: English

All Men Are Enemies is a 1934 American pre-Code drama film directed by George Fitzmaurice and written by Lenore J. Coffee. The film stars Helen Twelvetrees, Mona Barrie, Hugh Williams, Herbert Mundin, Henry Stephenson and Walter Byron. The film was released on April 20, 1934, by Fox Film Corporation. It is based on the 1933 novel of the same title by Richard Aldington.

The film was not a success at the box office, losing $223,000.

== Plot ==
A British aristocrat falls in love with an Austrian woman, before they are separated by the outbreak of the First World War.

== Cast ==
- Helen Twelvetrees as Katha
- Mona Barrie as Margaret Scrope
- Hugh Williams as Tony Clarendon
- Herbert Mundin as Noggins
- Henry Stephenson as Scrope
- Walter Byron as Walter Ripton
- Una O'Connor as Annie
- Matt Moore as Allerton
- Halliwell Hobbes as Clarendon
- Rafaela Ottiano as Filomena
- Mathilde Comont as Mamina
- David Torrence as Sir Charles Ripton
- Agostino Borgato as Babbo
- Josef Swickard as Katha's Father
- Adrienne D'Ambricourt as French Woman Taxi Driver
- C. Montague Shaw as Major
- Gustav von Seyffertitz as Baron
- Reginald Sheffield as Officer

== Bibliography ==
- Solomon, Aubrey. The Fox Film Corporation, 1915-1935: A History and Filmography McFarland, 2011.
