= Agner =

Agner or Agnér may refer to:

- Monte Agnèr, mountain of the Dolomites

== People ==
=== Surname ===
- Anna Agnér (1896–1977) Swedish painter

=== Given name ===
- Agner (footballer) (born 2005) Brazilian footballer
- Agner Krarup Erlang (1878–1929) Danish mathematician, engineer
- Agner Fog, Danish evolutionary anthropologist, computer scientist

== See also ==
- Anger (surname)
- Agnar
