= Ester Sowernam =

English writer

Ester Sowernam is the pseudonymous author of one of the first defences of women published in England and a participant in the Swetnam controversy of 1615–1620.

Her work, Ester Hath Hanged Haman: or an answere to a lewd pamphlet, entituled, the arraignment of women, with the arraignment of lewd, idle, froward, and unconstant men, and husbands (1617), was the second published response under a woman's name to Joseph Swetnam's misogynistic pamphlet The araignment of lewde, idle, froward and unconstant women (1615).

In Ester Hath Hanged Haman, Sowernam refutes Swetnam's claims, correcting the misattribution of the statement that women are a necessary evil to the Bible, and tracing it to Euripides' Medea. She employs both secular and religious arguments to counter Swetnam's accusations, incorporating Latin phrases, references to antiquity, biblical citations, and legal terminology to demonstrate women's capacity for mastering these subjects.

The only hint at Sowernam's identity lies in the title page description, which reads "neither Maide, Wife, nor Widdowe; yet really all and therefore experienced to defend all." Her use of numerous classic allusions, Latin phrases, legal jargon, and biblical references suggests a high level of education.

Her pen name is inspired by the biblical figure Esther in the Old Testament of the Bible, a Jewish heroine who defended the Israelites against Haman the Agagite.
