= Night Court (film) =

1932 film

- Directed by: W. S. Van Dyke
- Screenplay by: Bayard Veiller; Lenore Coffee
- Based on: Night Court unproduced play by Mark Hellinger; Charles Beahan
- Starring: Phillips Holmes; Walter Huston; Anita Page; Lewis Stone; Mary Carlisle
- Cinematography: Norbert Brodine
- Edited by: Ben Lewis
- Production company: Metro-Goldwyn-Mayer
- Distributed by: Loew's Inc.
- Release date: June 4, 1932
- Running time: 92 minutes
- Country: United States
- Language: English

Night Court is a 1932 American pre-Code crime film directed by W. S. Van Dyke and written by Bayard Veiller and Lenore Coffee. The film stars Phillips Holmes, Walter Huston, Anita Page, Lewis Stone and Mary Carlisle. The film was released June 4, 1932, by Metro-Goldwyn-Mayer.

== Plot ==
A corrupt judge frames an innocent woman while a police reformer works to bring his corruption to light.

== Cast ==
- Phillips Holmes as Mike Thomas
- Walter Huston as Judge Moffett
- Anita Page as Mary Thomas
- Lewis Stone as Judge Osgood
- Mary Carlisle as Elizabeth Osgood
- John Miljan as Crawford
- Jean Hersholt as Janitor
- Tully Marshall as Grogan
- Noel Francis as Lil Baker
