= The Woman's Prize =

Play by John Fletcher

The Woman's Prize, or the Tamer Tamed is a Jacobean comedy written by John Fletcher. It was first published in the first Beaumont and Fletcher folio of 1647, though it was written several decades earlier (Fletcher died in 1625). There is no doubt that the play is the work of Fletcher alone; his highly distinctive and characteristic pattern of linguistic preferences is continuous through the text.

The play is a counterpart to Shakespeare's The Taming of the Shrew, in which (as the subtitle indicates) the gender tables are turned and Petruchio the "tamer" is "tamed" by his second wife Maria, whom he marries after the death of Katherine, the "shrew" in Shakespeare's text. As a "reply" to Shakespeare's play, The Woman's Prize attracted critical attention in later generations and centuries. Maria's principal weapon, a refusal to consummate her marriage, shows the influence of Aristophanes' play Lysistrata.

== Characters ==
- Maria – wife to Petruchio, daughter of Petronius
- Livia – daughter of Petronius
- Biancha – cousin of Maria and Livia, commander-in-chief
- Moroso – elderly suitor of Livia
- Sophocles – friend to Petruchio
- Tranio – friend to Petruchio
- Petruchio – husband to Maria
- Rowland – suitor of Livia
- Petronius – father of Maria and Livia
- Jaques – servant of Petruchio
- Pedro – servant of Petruchio
- Doctor
- Apothecary
- City Wives
- Country Wives
- Maids
- Watchmen
- Porters

== Synopsis ==
Petruchio's stormy marriage to Katherine ended with her death. Petruchio is now married to Maria, who is even more resistant to domination than Katherine initially had been. Petruchio's tactics and manipulations are no longer effective, and Maria has some resourceful tricks of her own. Maria refuses to consummate their marriage till Petruchio changes his ways; she bands together with other women in abstention from sex with their husbands. The women barricade themselves with provisions in the upper floor of Maria's house, to the displeased surprise of their husbands below.

In Act Three, Maria settles in to pursue a career of scholarship and horsemanship at Petruchio's country estate, but the peace is again broken when Maria once more refuses to perform her conjugal duties and imposes further demands on her husband. Petruchio resolves to play ill in an attempt to awaken his wife's pity. His ruse fails totally when Maria catches on; with the pretext that he has caught the plague, Petruchio is walled up in his house.

Petruchio finally fights his way out, but in Act Four he discovers that his wife has "gone mad"—she has begun to dress like a common whore and is busy flirting with his friends. When Petruchio announces that he has had enough of marriage and is abandoning Maria for foreign travel, she encourages him to depart on the pretext that his journeys may broaden his vision and turn him into a better human being.

Almost totally defeated as Act Five opens, Petruchio tries one final stratagem in an attempt to awaken some spark of compassion in Maria. He decides to play dead, and is borne onstage in a coffin before his wife and friends. Maria is indeed moved to tears, but they are inspired, not by his person, but by his "unmanly, wretched, foolish life... how far below a man, how far from reason" Petruchio has remained.

This last salvo of abuse causes Petruchio to rise from his coffin in bewailment, prompting in Maria to state that she has finally "tamed" Petruchio. The two then pledge that they will start life anew together.

In the play's subplot, Livia joins in the protest of the married women, though her primary motive is to avoid an arranged marriage with the old and unpleasant Moroso and marry her own choice of husband, Roland. Both Maria and Livia succeed in attaining their wishes by the play's end.

== Date ==
The date of the play is very uncertain and has attracted a large body of dispute and opinion. A reference to the Siege of Ostend in Act I, scene iii has led some commentators to date the play as early as 1604 (the siege ended on 8 September that year) – though this is significantly earlier than the generally recognized start of Fletcher's dramatic career. Some scholars have argued for an early date, on the reasoning that a date closer in time to Shakespeare's play makes more sense than a later date. The non-Shakespearean or pre-Shakespearean version of the story, The Taming of a Shrew, was reprinted in 1607, and may have influenced Fletcher to make a reply. Other critics are of the belief the play was written between November 1609 and February 1610. Because of the riots that took place in 1607, a number of scholars believe the play could not have been written earlier than the final months of 1609 and attribute the play to the early years of the reign of King James I. Others have favored a date as late as 1618-22 for the original version of the play, based on internal characteristics of Fletcher's evolving style. Scholars who see a debt in the play to Ben Jonson's Epicene favor a date c. 1611. However, the first surviving reference to the play is contained in a government document dating on the morning of 18 October 1633 when Sir Henry Herbert, the Master of the Revels, 'sent a warrant by messenger of the chamber to suppress The Tamer Tamed, to the King's players for the afternoon'.

The question of date is complicated by the matter of revision. The characters all have Italian names, and the original was likely set in Italy – but the existing version is set in London instead. The date of revision and the identity of the reviser are equally unknown, though a reasonable conjecture holds that the revision was likely done just before the 1633 revival of the play by the King's Men, when the play was acted in conjunction with Shakespeare's.

== Sources ==
Fletcher borrowed the name, age, and nuptial desire of Moroso from the character Morose in Ben Jonson's comedy The Silent Woman (1609). In Jonson's play, Morose chooses a young bride for her demure silence, then after he marries her, learns she is the opposite of this. Fletcher reverses this by providing a "gentle tame" Maria, who is spurred to rebellion by marriage. Fletcher references the title of Jonson's play 'I never will believe a silent woman;/ When they break out they are bonfires'(1.3.110-11). In both plays the conflict between the married couple begins after the nuptials.

Fletcher's classical source for his play was Lysistrata. The Tamer Tamed was one of the first English plays based on Aristophanes, and Fletcher one of the first European critics to pay special attention to Lysistrata.

== The 1633 revival ==
The 1633 revival provoked the wrath of Sir Henry Herbert, the Master of the Revels and the overseer of London theatre in the Caroline era. On 19 October 1633, Herbert ordered the King's Men not to perform The Woman's Prize that day, because of complaints of the "foul and offensive matters" it contained; the company acted the Beaumont/Fletcher play The Scornful Lady instead. The warrant prohibited 'the acting of your play called The Tamer Tamed or The Taming of the Tamer, this afternoon, or any more till you have leave from me – and this is at your peril'. Five days later, on 24 October, John Lowin and Eliard Swanston, two of the leading actors in the company, came to Herbert's office to apologize personally for having given offense; their fellow actors Joseph Taylor and Robert Benfield were also present at the meeting, but apparently uninvolved in either the original offense or the apology. In regard to the same matter, Herbert addressed a 21 October letter to Edward Knight, the "book-keeper" or prompter of the King's Men, on the subject of "oaths, profaneness, and public ribaldry" in the company's plays. Herbert's reaction to the play, which may have been caused by accusations of leniency from his superiors, specifically the Archbishop of Canterbury, William Laud, caused tension between the acting companies and the censor. Herbert's intervention in the performance that day resulted in a greater focus on the re-licensing of old plays that were being revived at the time.

In order to de-politicise the play, a new prologue was introduced for the 1633 revival. Fletcher's play was cleaned up in time for a Court performance the next month: The Taming of the Shrew and The Woman's Prize were acted before Charles I of England and Henrietta Maria at St. James's Palace on 26 and 28 November respectively. According to Herbert, Shakespeare's play was "liked" but Fletcher's was "very well liked." The existing Prologue and Epilogue, perhaps by the unknown reviser, may date from this performance; the Epilogue claims that Fletcher's play urges "both sexes due equality...to love mutually" (lines 7–8).

== The manuscript ==
A manuscript of The Woman's Prize also survives, dating from this era. Appearing under the title of The Woman’s Prize: or, The Tamer Tamed the play was contained in the 1647 folio edition of thirty-four Comedies and Tragedies attributed to Beaumont and Fletcher.

The text of this manuscript comes from Herbert's licensed playbook. The editing of the manuscript has been interpreted by some scholars as showing that Herbert had other goals besides suppressing "public ribaldry." Some elements of vulgarity still appear in the manuscript despite Herbert's intervention. The original text of the play had some blatant anti-Catholic elements, which, according to this view, Herbert wanted to suppress out of deference to the Queen, Henrietta Maria.

Now residing in the Folger Library, another undated and untitled seventeenth-century manuscript survives. It appears to have been copied from the original source text, before Herbet's revision of the text in 1633. This, in turn, means that much of the content that was deemed by Herbert to be "offensive" is contained in this manuscript and the original text can be restored somewhat.

== Performance history ==
The play was probably first performed between December 1609 and April 1610 in the Whitefriars Theatre by the Children of the Queen's Revels, and would have been performed by a troupe of boys. It was revived in 1633, to the objection of the Master of Revels, who viewed it as vulgar. After the return of Charles II, it was one of the first plays performed after the official re-opening of the theatres.

The play was popular and was revived early and often in the Restoration era. Samuel Pepys saw it performed at the Cockpit Theatre on Tuesday 30 October 1660; it was played at the Vere Street theatre in Dec. 1661, and at Theatre Royal, Drury Lane in November 1668. When Fletcher's sequel and Shakespeare's original were revived jointly, in 1633 and in the 1660s, Fletcher's proved the more popular work; around 1667 The Shrew was adapted by John Lacy to make it a better match with The Woman's Prize. It was performed before Charles II twice, once at court in 1668 and again in a public theatre in 1674.

David Garrick adapted the play, but removed the subplot; it was performed at least three times, twice in 1757 and once in 1760, with Hannah Pritchard playing Maria.

In 1979, the full play was seen for the first time in over four hundred years when it was presented in Baltimore, Maryland's Harbor Shakespeare Festival, produced by Jeff Cohen, directed by John Beary and performed in repertory with "As You Like It" on an outdoor stage overlooking Baltimore's Inner Harbor. That production also marked the play's North American premiere. Cohen presented the play again in 1987 at the RAPP Arts Center in New York where it was filmed and archived at Lincoln Center's Theater On Film and Tape (TOFT) program and the Billy Rose Theater Collection.http://www.nypl.org/locations/lpa/theatre-film-and-tape-archive. Another adaption was performed at the Arcola Theatre in London in 2001 and featured a combination of Fletcher's play and Shakespeare's Taming of the Shrew. In 2003 The Woman's Prize; or, The Tamer Tamed was revived by the Royal Shakespeare Company, opening on 6 March and subsequently moving to the Kennedy Center.

== See also ==
- Swetnam the Woman-Hater
