= The Volga Boatman (1926 film) =

American silent film by Cecil B. DeMille

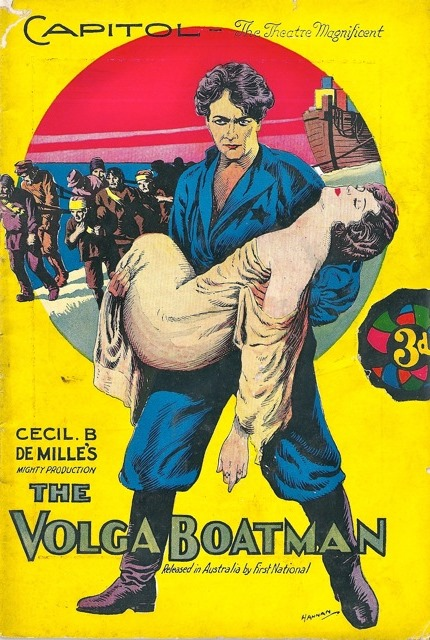
- Poster for film
- Directed by: Cecil B. DeMille; Frank Urson (asst. director)
- Written by: Lenore J. Coffee
- Based on: The Volga Boatman by Konrad Bercovici
- Produced by: Cecil B. DeMille
- Starring: William Boyd; Victor Varconi; Elinor Fair
- Cinematography: J. Peverell Marley; Arthur C. Miller; Fred Westerberg
- Edited by: Anne Bauchens
- Music by: Hugo Riesenfeld
- Production company: Cecil De Mille Pictures Corp.
- Distributed by: Producers Distributing Corporation
- Release date: April 4, 1926
- Running time: 120 minutes
- Country: United States
- Language: Silent (English intertitles)
- Budget: $479,357
- Box office: $1,275,375

The Volga Boatman is a 1926 American silent drama film directed by Cecil B. DeMille, who reportedly said the film was, "his greatest achievement in picture making". The film's budget was $479,000 and it grossed $1.27 million. The film was highly successful, turning William Boyd into matinee idol overnight.

== Plot ==
As described in a film magazine review, Vera, a princess engaged to a Russian nobleman, falls in love with Feodor, a young boatman. A revolution breaks out and the threatened princess is saved by the boatman, and brought to an inn as his wife. Here they are both captured by the royal army, where the woman’s former sweetheart makes her dance for the drunken soldiers. The boatman shoots one of them, and he and the princess are ordered to be shot. They are saved in time by the revolutionists, who force the noblemen to assume their places as boatmen. Realizing they are in love with each other, the boatman and the princess go their way.

== Cast ==
- William Boyd as Feodor, a Volga boatman
- Elinor Fair as Vera, a princess
- Robert Edeson as Prince Nikita
- Victor Varconi as Prince Dimitri
- Julia Faye as Mariusha, a gypsy
- Theodore Kosloff as Stefan, a blacksmith
- Arthur Rankin as Vashi, a Boatman
- Ed Brady as A Boatman (uncredited)
- Charles Clary as Red Army officer (uncredited)
- Gino Corrado as White Army officer (uncredited)
- Lillian Elliott as landlady (uncredited)
- John George as Red Army soldier (uncredited)

== Production ==
The film was based on a 1926 Konrad Bercovici novel of the same title and was adapted for the screen by Lenore J. Coffee. Mitchell Leisen, Anton Grot, and Max Parker served as art directors. Costumes were done by Adrian.

Location shooting for the film was carried out near Rio Vista, California, in 1925.

== Preservation ==
Complete prints of The Volga Boatman are held by:

- George Eastman Museum (on 35 mm)
- Cineteca Nazionale (on 35 mm)
- UCLA Film & Television Archive (on 35 mm)
- British Film Institute

== Home media ==
On June 27, 2000, the film was released on VHS by Kino Video. In July 2014, The Video Cellar released a lightly tinted DVD version of the film, and is currently the most widely available version. However, this version does not contain a musical score.
