= Angry (disambiguation) =

Angry is the adjective derived from the emotion of anger.

Angry may also refer to:

- "Angry" (The Rolling Stones song), 2023
- "Angry" (Mars Argo song), 2022
- "Angry" (1925 song)
- "Angry" (Matchbox Twenty song), 2000
- "Angry", a song by Billy Squier from his 1993 album Tell the Truth
- "Angry", a song by Quiet Riot from their 1999 album Alive and Well

== People with the surname ==
- Raymond Angry, American keyboardist, record producer and composer

== See also ==
- Anger (disambiguation)
