= W. E. Bennett =

American immunologist

William E. Bennett
- Education: Lincoln University; Temple University; University of Pennsylvania
- Scientific career
- Fields: Immunology

William E. Bennett is a senior scholar with the National Center for Science and Civic Engagement. He also has been a senior fellow with the Association of American Colleges and Universities. In recent years, he has served on boards and committees of university and academic associations, journals and the National Institutes of Health.

Bennett received his bachelor's degree from Lincoln University in Pennsylvania in 1950, and M.S. and Ph.D. from Temple University and the University of Pennsylvania, respectively. He was awarded a National Institutes of Health postdoctoral fellowship to work with noted Professor Zanvil A. Cohn and Nobel Prize winner Fritz Lipmann, at the Rockefeller University. Bennett holds two honorary doctorates and one from his alma mater, Lincoln University (2010). He is also a member of Alpha Phi Alpha.

== Publications ==
- Bennett, W. E.; Cohn, Z. (1966). "The Isolation and Selected Properties of Blood Monocytes". Journal of Experimental Medicine. 123 (1): 145–160. doi:10.1084/jem.123.1.145. PMC 2138130. PMID 4285446.
