= François M. Angers =

Canadian judge

Honourable François M. Angers, Q.C.

Tax Court of Canada
- In office August 1, 2001 – 2013

François M. Angers served as a judge on the Tax Court of Canada.
