= Thomas W. Swetnam =

Thomas W. Swetnam (born 1955) is Regents' Professor Emeritus of Dendrochronology at the University of Arizona, studying disturbances of forest ecosystems across temporal and spatial scales. He served as the Director of the Laboratory of Tree-Ring Research from 2000 to 2015.

== Education ==
Swetnam received his bachelor's degree in biology and chemistry from the University of New Mexico and subsequently received his master's and PhD from the University of Arizona in watershed management and dendrochronology.

== Recognition ==
He received the A.E. Douglass award from the University of Arizona, the W.S. Cooper award from the Ecological Society of America (with Julio Betancourt) and the Henry Cowles award from the American Association of Geographers (with James H. Speer). He was elected a Fellow of the American Association For the Advancement of Science in 2015. He received the Harold C. Fritts Lifetime Achievement Award from the Tree-Ring Society in 2016. He received the Harold Biswell Award for Lifetime Achievement from the Association for Fire Ecology in 2016.

== Advisor ==
He has served on the following advisory and editorial boards:

- 2000-2004 Board of trustees, Valles Caldera National Preserve
- 2003-2006 Arizona Forest Health Advisory Council
- 2005-2006 Arizona Climate Change Advisory Group
- 1993–present associate editor, International Journal of Wildland Fire
- 2000-2001 editor, Tree-Ring Research
- 1994-1998 associate editor, Ecoscience
- 1998 associate editor, Canadian Journal of Forest Research
- 1998-1999 editorial board, Ecological Applications
- 2005–2012 associate editor, Dendrochronlogia
- 2016–2019 board of trustees, The Nature Conservancy, New Mexico

== Research ==
He has authored and co-authored more than 120 scientific papers in journals and symposium proceedings, including the following frequently cited/significant papers:

- Swetnam, T. W.; Betancourt, J. L. (1990). "Fire-Southern Oscillation Relations in the Southwestern United States". Science. 249 (4972): 1017–20. Bibcode:1990Sci...249.1017S. doi:10.1126/science.249.4972.1017. PMID 17789609. S2CID 5687227.
- Swetnam, T. W. (1993). "Fire History and Climate Change in Giant Sequoia Groves". Science. 262 (5135): 885–9. Bibcode:1993Sci...262..885S. doi:10.1126/science.262.5135.885. PMID 17757357. S2CID 43064334.
- Swetnam, T. W.; Lynch, A. M. (1993). "Multicentury, Regional-Scale Patterns of Western Spruce Budworm Outbreaks". Ecological Monographs. 63 (4): 399. Bibcode:1993EcoM...63..399S. doi:10.2307/2937153. JSTOR 2937153.
- Swetnam, T. W. and C. H. Baisan, 1996. Historical fire regime patterns in the Southwestern United States since AD 1700. In C. Allen, editor, Fire effects in Southwestern Forests, Proceedings of the Second La Mesa Fire Symposium, Los Alamos, New Mexico, March 29–31, 1994. USDA Forest Service General Technical Report RM-GTR-286:11-32.
- Swetnam, T. W.; Betancourt, J. L. (1998). "Mesoscale Disturbance and Ecological Response to Decadal Climatic Variability in the American Southwest". Journal of Climate. 11 (12): 3128–3147. Bibcode:1998JCli...11.3128S. doi:10.1175/1520-0442(1998)011<3128:MDAERT>2.0.CO;2.
- Swetnam, T. W.; Allen, C. D.; Betancourt, J. L. (1999). "Applied Historical Ecology: Using the Past to Manage for the Future". Ecological Applications. 9 (4): 1189–1206. doi:10.1890/1051-0761(1999)009[1189:AHEUTP]2.0.CO;2.
- Westerling, L.; Hidalgo, G.; Cayan, R.; Swetnam, W. (Aug 2006). "Warming and earlier spring increase western U.S. Forest wildfire activity" (PDF). Science. 313 (5789): 940–943. Bibcode:2006Sci...313..940W. doi:10.1126/science.1128834. ISSN 0036-8075. PMID 16825536.
- Kitzberger, T.; Brown, P. M.; Heyerdahl, E. K.; Swetnam, T. W.; Veblen, T. T. (2006). "Contingent Pacific-Atlantic Ocean influence on multicentury wildfire synchrony over western North America". Proceedings of the National Academy of Sciences. 104 (2): 543–548. Bibcode:2007PNAS..104..543K. doi:10.1073/pnas.0606078104. PMC 1766421. PMID 17197425.

== Edited books ==
- Dean, J. S., D. M. Meko, and T. W. Swetnam, eds., 1996. Tree Rings, Environment, and Humanity, Proceedings of the International Conference, Tucson, Arizona, 17–21 May 1994. Radiocarbon, Tucson Arizona. 889 pp.
- Veblen, Thomas T. (2003). Fire and Climatic Change in Temperate Ecosystems of the Western Americas. Springer. p. 413. ISBN 978-0-387-95455-4.
