= Joseph Swetnam =

English pamphleteer and fencing master

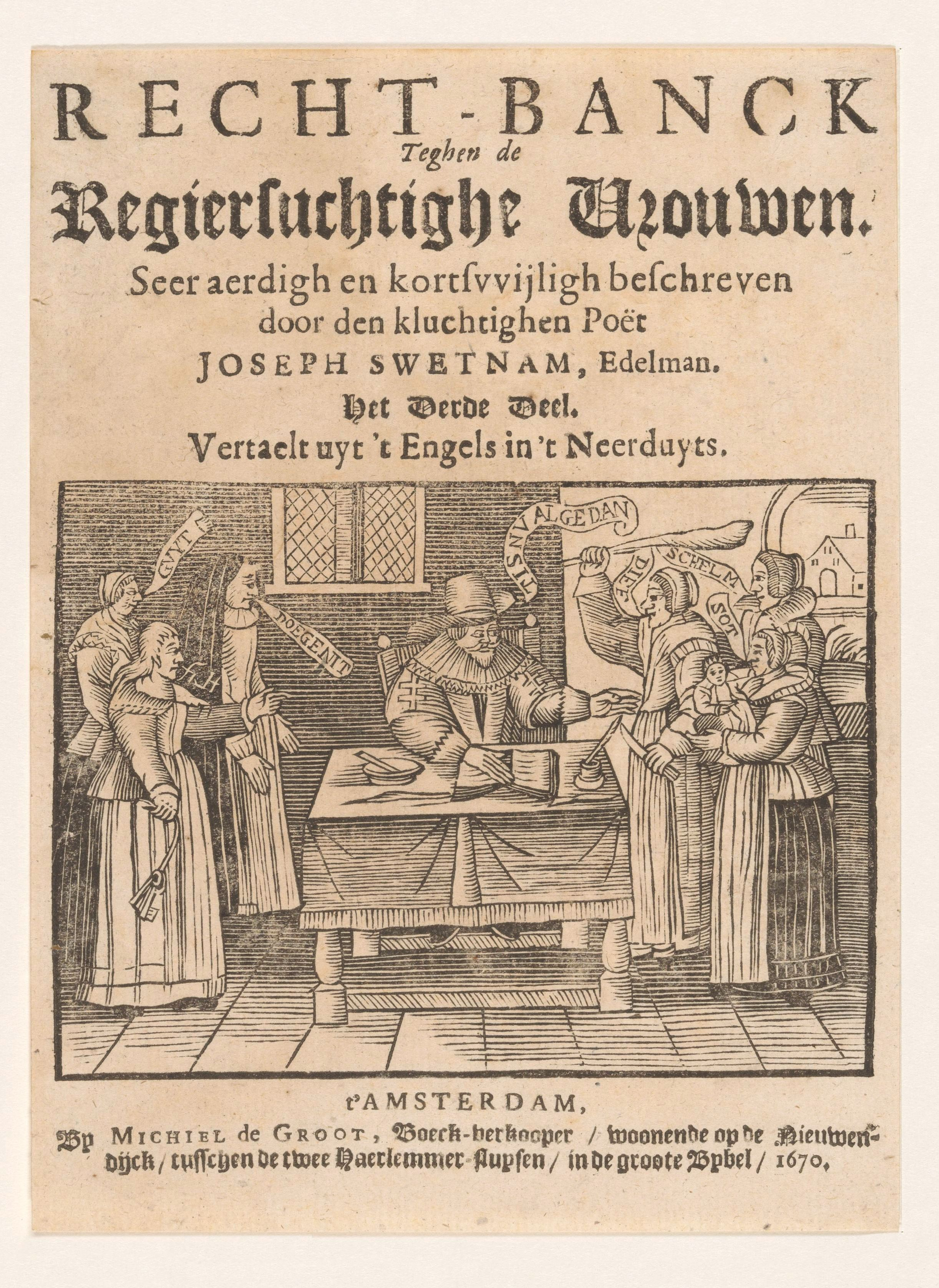
Joseph Swetnam. Recht-banck Teghen de Regiersuchtighe Vrouwen. Amsterdam: Michiel de Groot, 1670.

Joseph Swetnam (died 1621) was an English pamphleteer and fencing master. He is best known for his 1615 treatise The araignment of lewde, idle, froward and unconstant women (sic) and a fencing handbook published in 1617 titled The schoole of the noble and worthy science of defence.

== The pamphlet wars ==
Swetnam's controversial pamphlet The araignment of women contributed to the querelle des femmes, or question of a woman's place within early modern English society. The misogynistic and patriarchal rhetoric in Araignment was not lost on Swetnam's readers, sparking a series of response pamphlets in defense of women over the ensuing years.

=== The Arraignment of Women (1615) ===
The arraignment of lewd, idle, froward, and unconstant women was published in 1615 under the pseudonym Thomas Tell-Troth. A reprinting of the pamphlet later that year would be attributed directly to Swetnam. The success and controversy of 'Araignment' kept the pamphlet in circulation throughout the 17th and into the 18th century.

Swetnam describes in this document what he views as the sinful, deceiving, worthless nature of women. He addresses his remarks to young men of the world, as if warning them about the dangers of womankind. He cites personal experiences as well as those of well-known biblical and classical figures to authenticate his claims. Obviously intended for a male audience, much of the pamphlet takes the comical form of what we might today call sexist jokes. For example, Swetnam writes, "A gentleman on a time said to his friend, 'I can help you to a good marriage for your son.' His friend made him this answer: 'My son,' said he, 'shall stay till he have more wit.' The Gentleman replied again, saying, 'If you marry him not before he has wit, he will never marry so long as he lives.'"

His borrowing of authority from biblical figures was far more powerful and inflammatory, especially in Protestant England. Most material in attacks on women and in their defence was taken from the Bible, by all writers engaged in the debate. An important part of any author's attack or defence of women (as well as other subjects of debate) was interpretation and counter-interpretation of the Bible to support his or her perspective. Swetnam draws somewhat from the much-debated scene of the Garden of Eden, saying that woman "was no sooner made but straightway...procured man's fall", but he spends more time naming various victims of seduction, including David, Solomon, and Samson, blaming their falls from Godly grace on the wiles of the women with whom they sinned. He even makes use of a number of legendary figures in classical antiquity, including Hercules, Agamemnon, and Ulysses, citing the travails they suffered at the hands of women. While citing scriptural examples lends religious authority to his claims, using classical examples, even those from a mythology deemed false by Christian beliefs, appeals to the sense of antiquity and cultural superiority associated with Rome.

The Arraignment of Women was extremely popular—there were thirteen "known reprints" in the 17th century and another five in the early 18th century; it was even translated into Dutch as Recht-Banck tegen de Luye, Korzelighe, en Wispeltuyrighe Vrouwen in 1641 (to be reprinted four times in the 17th century, with two further editions in the early 18th). Some scholars propose that this popularity was due to its heavy drawing from previous works, including and especially John Lyly's Euphues, and its consequent sense of inclusiveness. Others suppose it could have been its decisively middle-class emphasis and humor. It is also possible that it became popular because of the reaction it sparked from other writers, which seems to be its most distinguishing characteristic.

=== Response ===
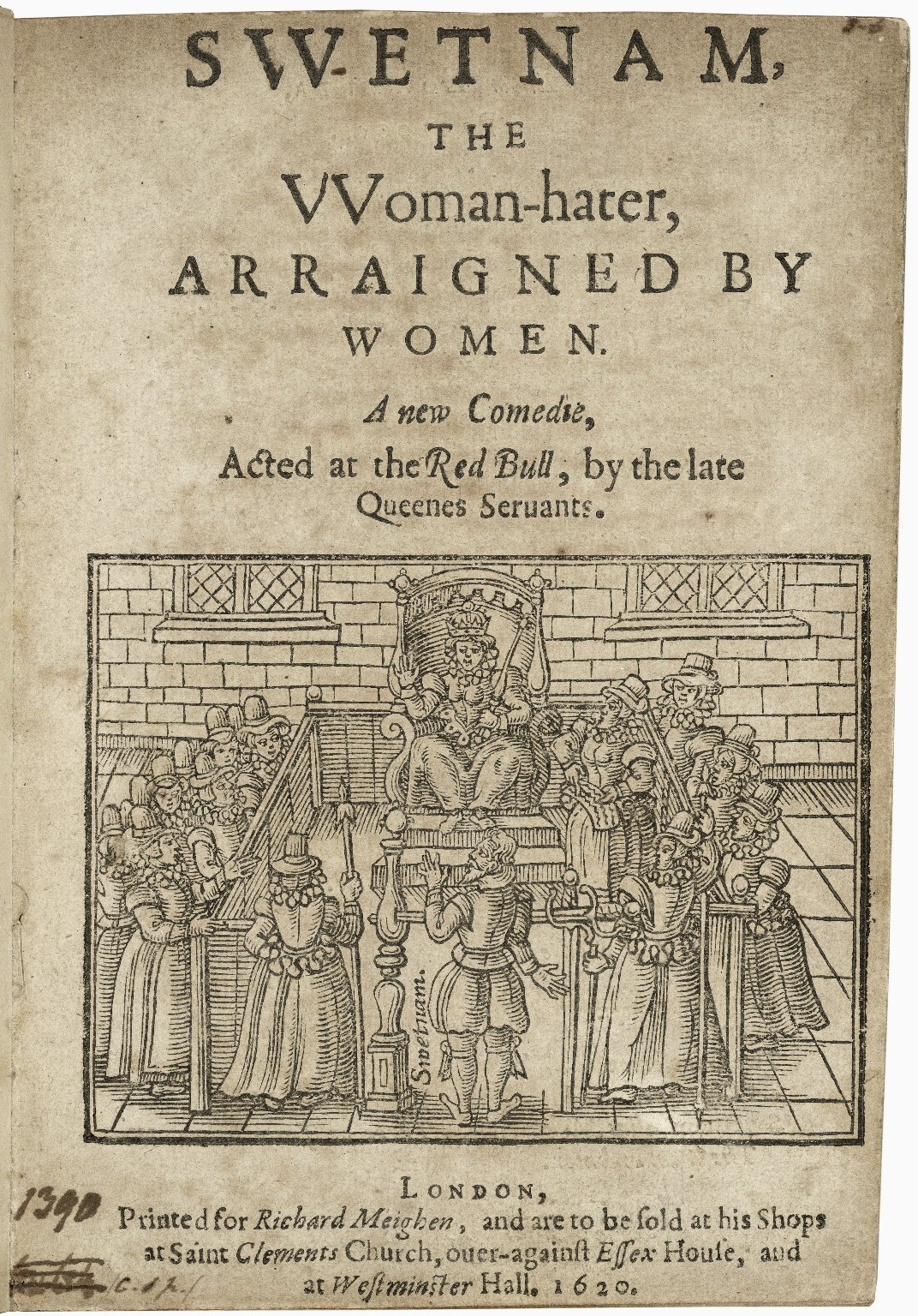
Swetnam, the Woman-hater, arraigned by women, printed by William Stansby for Richard Meighen, 1620

Three female writers responded independently to Swetnam's work, in defence of their gender. The first response was by Rachel Speght, writing under her own name. A Mouzell for Melastomus focuses on biblical material, interpreting scripture to counter Swetnam's attacks, while criticising its grammar and style. She writes, "Whoso makes the fruit of his cogitations extant to the view of all men should have his work to be as a well-tuned instrument, in all places according and agreeing, the which I am sure yours doth not" (p. 36). She also responds briefly to his tract in her second publication, Mortalities Memorandum.

The second response came in 1617 from a writer under the pseudonym Esther Sowernam ("Sour"nam, as opposed to "Sweet"nam). Ester Hath Hang'd Haman is most notable for its reasoned and well-ordered argument.

Next, also in 1617, was Worming of a Mad Dogge, by a writer under the pseudonym Constantia Munda. This tract deployed both invective and learning of French, Italian, Latin and the language of the law. The demonstration of wide education and the inventive used has cast doubt of Constantia being a woman, but within the text she indicates that she is a daughter. The pamphlet was recorded on 29 April 1617 by Laurence Hayes without an author. It has been guessed that the writer may have been employed by Hayes.

Another reply to Swetnam was the comic play, Swetnam the Woman-Hater Arraigned by Women (1620), anonymously written. In it, Swetnam, under the name "Misogynos", is made uncomfortable at the hands of the women he despises. The play reflects the popularity of Swetnam's tract with the "common people": it was performed at London's Red Bull Theatre, which had a populist reputation. The play is credited with originating the English term misogyny.

== Fencing manual ==
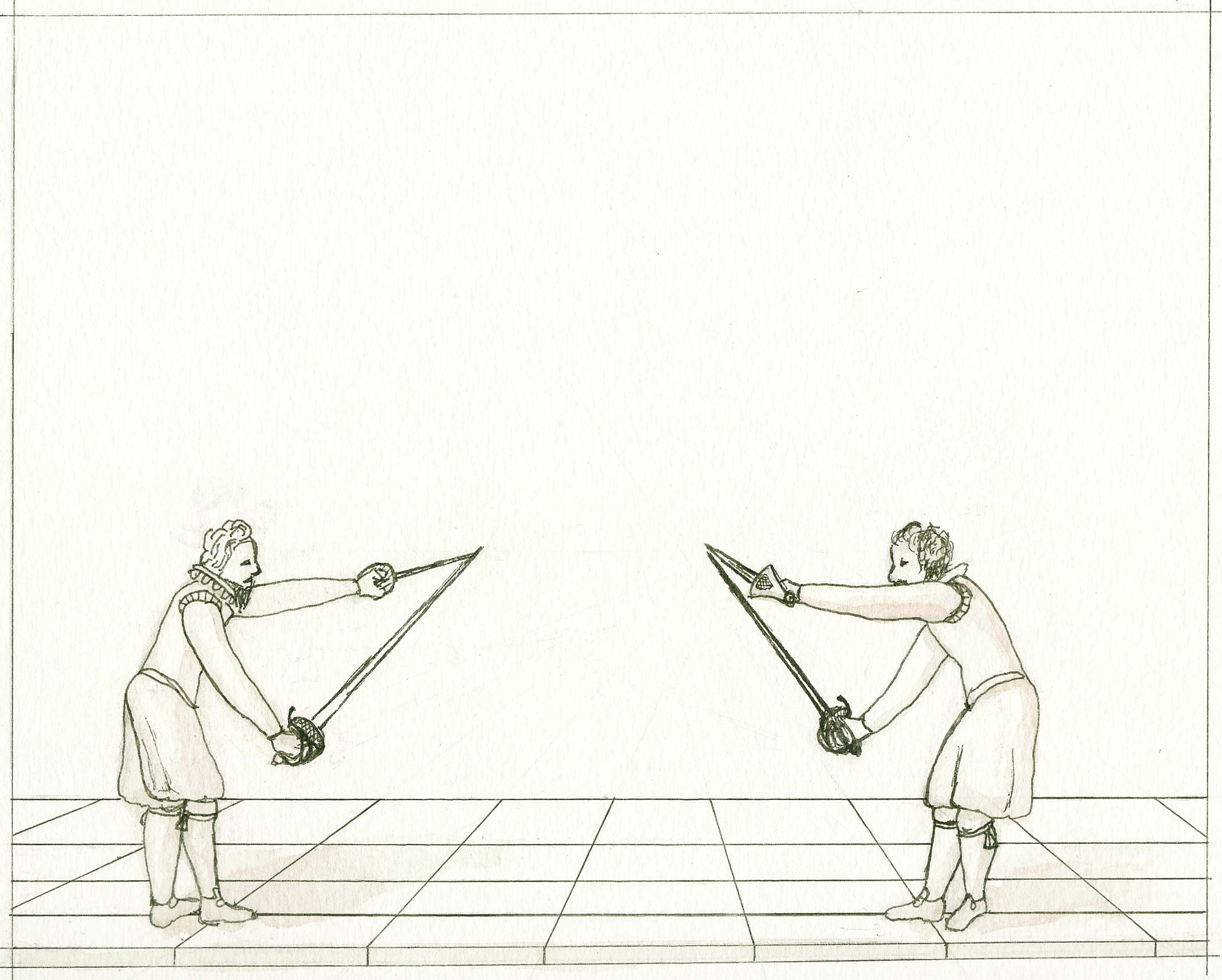
True guard for rapier and dagger as described by Swetnam.

In his 1617 fencing treatise, The Schoole of the Noble and Worthy Science of Defence, Joseph Swetnam represents himself as the fencing instructor for the then-deceased Prince Henry, who, after having read the treatise, urged Swetnam to print it—according to Swetnam. There is no record of his employment in Henry's service. The treatise itself is a manual detailing the use of the rapier, rapier and dagger, backsword, sword and dagger, and quarterstaff, prefaced with eleven chapters of moral and social advice relating to fencing, self-defence, and honour. Swetnam claims that his fencing treatise is "the first of any English-mans invention, which professed the sayd Science".

Swetnam is known for teaching a unique series of special guards (such as the fore-hand guard, broadwarde, lazie guard, and crosse guard), though his primary position is a "true guard", which varies slightly for each weapon. He advocates the use of thrusts over cuts and makes heavy use of feints. Swetnam favoured fencing from a long distance, using the lunge, and not engaging weapons. His defences are mostly simple parries, together with slips (evasive movements backward).

Swetnam's fencing system has been linked both to contemporary Italian systems as well as the traditional sword arts of England; his guard positions resemble those of contemporary Italian instructors, but his fencing system appears structurally different, and more closely related to a lineage of English fencing. He is also distinctive in his advice to wound rather than kill an opponent.

== Personal life ==
Nothing is known about his ancestral origins or other family life other than the fact that he had a daughter named Elizabeth, who married in the church of St Augustine the Less Church on 4 November 1613 and died in 1626. In a letter of administration drawn up after her death, Swetnam is referred to as "nuper de civit[ate] Bristoll" ("late of the city of Bristol"). According to a letter of administration, Swetnam died abroad in 1621.
