= The Faithful Friends =

Early seventeenth-century stage play

The Faithful Friends is an early seventeenth-century stage play, a tragicomedy associated with the canon of John Fletcher and his collaborators. Never printed in its own century, the play is one of the most disputed works in English Renaissance drama.

== Date ==
The play's date of authorship is unknown; scholars, judging on internal features, have conjectured dates ranging from 1604 to 1626. Possible allusions to the December 1613 marriage of Robert Carr, 1st Earl of Somerset have been read as indicating a date c. 1614 – though another allusion to Philip III of Spain and the Duke of Lerma seems to favor 1618–21 or later.

== Manuscript ==
The Faithful Friends was entered into the Stationers' Register on 29 June 1660 by bookseller Humphrey Moseley. Moseley did not publish the play, though, prior to his death in the next year, 1661. The play remained in manuscript – now known as Dyce MS. 10 – until it was first published in Henry William Weber's 1812 edition of Beaumont and Fletcher. "The MS. is in various hands, one of which has made corrections. Some of these seem on internal evidence to have been due to suggestions of the censor, others to playhouse exigencies." The main hand in the MS. is thought to be that of Edward Knight, the "book-keeper" or prompter of the King's Men. Knight may have purged oaths from the text, though he also left gaps in his manuscript, rather than guess at the intended meaning, where he couldn't read the "foul papers" or authorial draft from which he worked.

== Authorship ==
In the Stationers' Register entry, Moseley called The Faithful Friends a Beaumont and Fletcher work. Critics who have considered the play's authorship have started with the attribution to Beaumont and Fletcher, but have also postulated other potential writers, including Philip Massinger, Nathan Field, James Shirley, and Robert Daborne. Commentators have also proposed hypotheses of revision, even multiple revision; E.H.C. Oliphant thought that the play was written by Beaumont and Fletcher, revised by Field c. 1610–11, and revised again by Massinger c. 1613–14. None of these arguments has won acceptance from a consensus of scholars; the play's perceived low dramatic quality appears to stand as an argument against the presence of major talents.

The forest scene of the play bears a general resemblance to the one in Philaster; faithful male friendship is one of the perennial (and easily imitated) dramatic themes of Fletcher.

== Anachronisms ==
The play is given a classical setting during the Roman Kingdom, but it actually occurs in the dramatic neverland of the English Renaissance stage. Its supposedly-ancient Romans refer to Niccolò Machiavelli, John of Gaunt and the Guildhall of London, among other anachronisms. (See The Old Law and Thierry and Theodoret for comparable cases.)

== Synopsis ==
Marius, a noble young Roman, returns to Rome after a period of exile, to find that conditions have changed – especially for his friend Marcus Tullius. Tullius is now the favorite of the king, Titus Martius; the young man has also celebrated his wedding, just two days before, to his fiancée Philadelphia (the play's heroine). The married couple have yet to consummate their marriage: the chaste Philadelphia has requested that they sleep apart for the first three nights of their marriage. Now, suddenly, the king has named Marcus Tullius to lead Rome's army in defense against the rebellious Sabines; Philadelphia must remain a virgin wife for some time still.

The two friends meet with great warmth, but also with one point of confusion: when Marius inquires about the welfare of Lelia, his love and Marcus's sister, Marcus asks the same question of him. It seems that Lelia has been missing since Marius went into exile, and her family and friends though she had followed him; but Marius knows nothing of her whereabouts. In fact, Lelia is living in Rome, disguised as Philadelphia's boy page Janus (and, in an absurd convention of Fletcherian-style drama, nobody, not even her own brother, manages to recognize her).

A faction of older courtiers is outraged that the upstart Marcus Tullius has been given command of the army; Rufinus, the boldest and most ruthless of them, upbraids the king about this to his face. The king confesses that he has an ulterior motive in sending Marcus out from Rome – Titus Martius lusts after Philadelphia, and wants to use Rufinus as his go-between in seducing the virgin bride. The proud and prickly Rufinus is offended by this, but decides to use to king's infatuation for his own ends. Rufinus wants to see Marcus Tullius dead.

While fighting the Sabines, Marcus Tullius receives messages warning him about treachery at home. He leaves the front in Marius's charge, instructing his friend to dress in his armor so that no one will know of the substitution. While taking his friend's place, Marius receives a message from the Sabine commander, offering peace terms. Marius meets with Sabinus, only to fall to an assassination attempt; the king has offered the rebels clemency if they murder Marcus Tullius (Rufinus isn't the only one who wants the young man dead), and they strike at the disguised Marius as a result. Marius is wounded and thought dead, but the protection he wears under his clothing frustrates the fatal blow. The page Janus rescues him, and reveals herself as Lelia, his lost love.

Back in Rome, Marcus Tullius and his supporters disguise themselves as masquers at a royal banquet. Marcus spies upon the king's attempt to seduce Philadelphia, and sees her resistance; he confronts the king, who claims that he was merely testing her chastity (another Fletcherian dramatic convention), and that he knows nothing about any murder plot – but he vows to expose such evil goings-on. In the play's final scene, the machinations of Rufinus and his cohorts are exposed; Marcus Tullius urges the king to pardon their lives, as long as they are driven far from the royal court.

The play also contains an abundance of comic material, centering on the ridiculous suitor Sir Pergamus, and the soldier Captain Bellario and his motley group of recruits.

== Sources ==
- Chambers, E. K. The Elizabethan Stage. 4 Volumes, Oxford, Clarendon Press, 1923.
- Ioppolo, Grace. Dramatists and Their Manuscripts in the Age of Shakespeare, Jonson, Middleton and Heywood. London, Routledge, 2006.
- Logan, Terence P., and Denzell S. Smith, eds. The Popular School: A Survey and Bibliography of Recent Studies in English Renaissance Drama. Lincoln, NE, University of Nebraska Press, 1975.
- Mehl, Dieter. "Beaumont and Fletcher's The Faithful Friends." Anglia 80 (1962), pp. 417–24.
- Oliphant, E. H. C. The Plays of Beaumont and Fletcher: An Attempt to Determine Their Respective Shares and the Shares of Others. New Haven, Yale University Press, 1927.
