= Agnar =

- Gender: Male

Origin
- Origin: Old Norse
- Region of origin: Scandinavian countries

Other names
- Alternative spelling: Agnarr, Agner

Agnar or Agnarr is a masculine given name of Scandinavian origin. The name is a compound. The first part is either the word agn 'punishment, deed' or egg 'knife edge', and the second part is from harr 'warrior'. It has the variant Agner.

== Given name ==
In 2022, 29 men in Denmark and 755 men in Norway had the name. Its name day is June 21st.

- Agnar Helgason (born 1968), Icelandic scientist
- Agnar Johannes Barth (1871–1948), Norwegian forester
- Agnar Mykle (1915–1994), Norwegian writer
- Agnar Sandmo (1938-2019), Norwegian economist

== Fictional characters ==
- Agnarr Geirröðsson, son of King Geirröðr in the Poetic Edda poem Grímnismál
- King Agnar, a character in the Disney Frozen franchise
- Chief of the Mangalores in the 1997 movie The Fifth Element
