= François-Réal Angers =

Canadian lawyer and writer

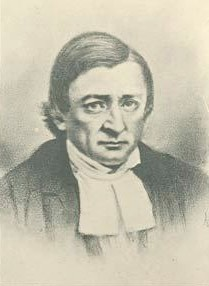
Portrait of François-Réal Angers

François-Réal Angers (20 November 1812 – 27 March 1860) was a lawyer and writer from Quebec, Canada. He was born in Pointe-aux-Trembles (now Neuville, Quebec) to a family of farmers.

He collaborated to the foundation of the short-lived Société littéraire in 1830. In 1836, while studying law, he published the booklet Système de sténographie, applicable au français et à l'anglais. The following year, he was received at the bar and became the recorder of proceedings in the Legislative Assembly of Lower Canada. He later published his chronicle Révélations du crime ou Cambray et ses complices (English translation : The Canadian brigands; an intensely exciting story of crime in Quebec, thirty years ago!, Montreal, 1867). From 1845 to 1848, Angers was joint editor of the Revue de législation et de jurisprudence, and from 1850 to 1851, he was president of the Institut canadien de Québec. He married Louise Panet in 1853.

Between 1851 and 1860, Angers collaborated to the work Décisions des tribunaux du Bas-Canada.
