= Rachel Speght =

Poet and polemicist

Rachel Speght (1597 – death date unknown) was a poet and polemicist. She was the first Englishwoman to identify herself, by name, as a polemicist and critic of misogyny. Speght, a feminist and a Calvinist, is perhaps best known for her tract A Mouzell for Melastomus (London, 1617). It is a prose refutation of Joseph Swetnam's misogynistic tract, The Arraignment of Lewd, Idle, Froward, and Unconstant Women, and a significant contribution to the Protestant discourse of biblical exegesis, defending women's nature and the worth of womankind. Speght also published a volume of poetry, Mortalities Memorandum with a Dreame Prefixed (London, 1621), a Christian reflection on death and a defence of the education of women.

== Life ==
Speght was born in London, England in 1597, the daughter of a Calvinist minister. "She was brought up in the heart of London's clerical and mercantile community. She had three surviving siblings, and two that died in infancy. Her siblings were Sara, Rebecca, and Samuel." Her writings reveal that she was unusually well educated in rhetoric, logic, classical and Christian texts, and Latin, and that she had a thorough knowledge of Christian scripture. "Rachel's education was unusual for a young woman of her time and social position in its thoroughness, and exceptional in that it was based on a classical curriculum."

The identity of her mother is unknown, but she seems to have been a profound influence on her. Speght refers to her mother's death as an inspiration for her Mortalities Memorandum. Speght's godmother Mary Moundeford (née Hill), wife of the eminent physician Thomas Moundeford, was another influence; Speght dedicated Mortalities Memorandum to her.

James Speight, Rachel's father, was an ordained doctor of divinity from Christ's college in Cambridge. He was the rector of two London churches, St. Mary Magdalen, Milk Street (1592–1637) and St. Clement, Eastcheap (1611–1637), and was also an author of religious tracts. "At the time of Rachel's birth he was about thirty-three years old and an established figure in clerical circles." His salary allowed his family to live comfortably.

From Speght's work it can be discerned that her mother died after the publication of Mouzell in 1617 and before the publication of Mortalities Memorandum in 1621; Speght's father was remarried in February 1621; he died in 1637.

Rachel Speght was married at age 24, on 2 August 1621, to a Calvinist minister named William Procter at St Mary Woolchurch Haw in London. Her father did not perform the ceremony, but gave his blessing. She lived with her husband in Upminster, Essex, until 1627, then in London at St. Giles, Cripplegate, until 1634. They had three children, Rachel (1627), William (1630) and Joseph (1634). Rachel and William were baptised at St Giles Cripplegate.

After 1634 she lived in Stradishall in Suffolk. William Procter was ejected from his parish over a controversy concerning his Laudian sympathies in 1644. Rachel Procter was named as a participant in the controversy. Procter died in Stradishall in 1661, and it is likely that his wife predeceased him, as she is not mentioned in his will.

== Work ==
Rachel Speght is considered the first Englishwoman to identify herself, by name, as a polemicist and critic of gender ideology. Speght published twice in her lifetime. Speght's writings include response essays, pamphlets, and pieces of poetry.

=== A Mouzell for Melastomus ===
At age 19, Speght published A Mouzell for Melastomus (London, 1617) (the title means "a muzzle for black mouth"), a prose refutation of Joseph Swetnam's misogynistic The Arraignment of Lewde, Idle, Froward, and Unconstant Women (London, 1615). "Speght is one of the first Western women to recognize, in print, that jokes against women are usually more than just harmless banter. Speght interprets Swetnam's book as a serious attack against women. The first letter addresses fellow women, and the second is directed to Swetnam himself. In both letters she quotes from such classical figures as Aristotle and Tacitus, and she draws from various Greek and Roman myths." By employing these devices, Speght establishes ethos with her audience and her credibility as author and speaker.

Speght's was the first of three responses to Swetnam's tract, and was the only one published under the author's actual name. Ester Hath Hang'd Haman was written under the name Ester Sowernam (S[ou]rnam is a pun against Swe[e]tnam), and condescends to Speght as a young, inexperienced, minister's daughter. The Worming of a Madde Dogge, written under the name Constantia Munda (from the Latin for "pure constancy"), praises Speght and assumes a defensive stance against an anticipated attack on Speght from Swetnam. Swetnam did not write a response to Speght, yet his popular Arraignment of Women ran through ten editions by 1634.

Swetnam's tract was first published under the pseudonym of Thomas Tel-Troth. In Mouzell, Speght reveals Swetnam's identity by way of a clever acrostic poem on Swetnam's name; thereafter, his tract was reprinted with his name. His tract is typical of the tradition of misogynist writing at the time; it is full of rowdy jokes, anecdotes and examples of women's lechery, vanity and worthlessness. The conventions of the polemic controversy over women in the English Renaissance are said to be more rhetorically based than ideologically based, as is Swetnam's style; writers participated in a game of wit for their own amusement, rather than a moral or ideological debate.

Faithful to her stated intention, Speght attacks Swetnam's logic and grammar. She uses satire and witty word play to denounce his character and his arguments, calling him "Irreligious and Illiterate" (Speght, title page). "Speght relies on a host of stylistic devices, including antistrephon, in which the rhetor counters an argument by using the same evidence as the rhetor's opponent. Speght is also particularly fond of metaphors and similes, and she uses them with devastating effectiveness in furthering her argument against Swetnam." But Speght also breaks convention by refusing to engage in polemical gaming. She develops her own, logic-based arguments on the basis of scripture in a serious attempt to change gender ideology.

Perhaps most remarkable was Speght's interpretive, gender-focused approach to biblical exegesis. She re-interpreted Christian scripture, notably the Creation-Fall story in Genesis. Her approach, both logic-based and re-interpretive, influenced both the Protestant discourse of biblical exegesis, and the writings and activities of some Jacobean women who were posing challenges to gender hierarchy (for example, female cross-dressing), at the time.

Historically, Speght's tract is significant on a number of levels. It was rare that an early modern woman would write or publish at all, let alone that the writing would be learned, logic-based and rhetorically refined. Her authorship was also rare in that Speght was an unknown, middle-class, unmarried, young woman. Unlike the other writers that entered the debate, Speght was also willing to attach her identity to her writing that directly attacks a male author and his work. Speght was confident in her intellect and had a strong sense of self proven by her courage to launch herself into the public sphere.

Speght boldly uses the Bible, historically used to subjugate women, to argue that it is indeed God's will that women be treated with equal respect to men; she goes as far as to warn men that they may be punished by God if they speak or write against good women (note: she specifies ‘good’ women), whom, Speght says, “God hath made equall with themselves in dignity, both temporally and eternally” (Lewalski, 26).

=== Mortalities Memorandum with a Dreame Prefixed ===
At age 24, Speght published Mortalities Memorandum with a Dreame Prefixed (London, 1621), a volume of two poems that urge and offer a Christian meditation on death, and defend the education of women. She dedicates it to her godmother, Mary Hill Moundford. The piece received little attention compared to A Mouzell for Melastomus.

Speght gives more insight into her sense of self in her volume of poetry. The first poem called The Dreame, which is one of only two published dream visions written by a woman in the early modern period, defends the education of women with an allegory of the writer's struggle to enter the world of learning and her devastating departure from it. According to The Dreame, women's education is necessary to both improve women's minds, and most importantly, to save their souls. It claims that women and men are suited to education on the same basis – the equality of intellect – and that God requires the use of all talents from both sexes. Near the end of the poem, an unnamed event related to gender causes her to cease her educational pursuits, after which, her mother dies, and her writing must cease.

Mortalities Memorandum is a Christian meditation on death written in the conventional Protestant style of moral essay. Speght uses both classical and scriptural references in her poem to urge the reader to meditate on and prepare for death.

The two poems are most often studied separately as unrelated works because of their differences in style, tone and stated purpose. However, as a preface, some say that The Dreame cannot help but influence the reader's interpretation of Mortalities Memorandum. Because Speght believed, as a Calvinist, that one's god-given talent must be used for the benefit of the common good, Speght believed writing to be her true Christian vocation. Drawing the themes of the devastating and damning cessation of her true vocation together with a meditation on death perhaps reflects that Speght viewed life as a "prison which denies women the liberating salvation of education for their minds and their souls" (Vecchi, 3).

According to scholar Meg Lota Brown: "The poem is 1,056 lines of iambic pentameter, 300 lines of which constitute 'The Dreame'; the rhyme scheme of the six-line stanzas is abcbdd."

== Links to Speght's texts ==
- A Mouzell for Melastomus
- Mortalities Memorandum with a Dreame Prefixed

== Links to related texts ==
- Munda, Constantia. The Worming of a mad Dogge
- Sowernam, Ester. Ester hath hang’d Haman
- Swetnam, Joseph. The Araignment of Lewde, idle, froward, and unconstant women
