= Jane Anger =

English feminist writer

- Writing career
- Language: English
- Period: 16th century
- Subject: Feminism
- Notable work: Jane Anger Her Protection For Women

Jane Anger was an English writer and the first woman to publish a full-length defence of her sex in English. The title of her defense, Jane Anger Her Protection For Women was published in 1589. In the late sixteenth century, it was rare for women to write and publish on secular, or non-religious themes. It was also rare for women to argue against male supremacy.

== Life and career ==
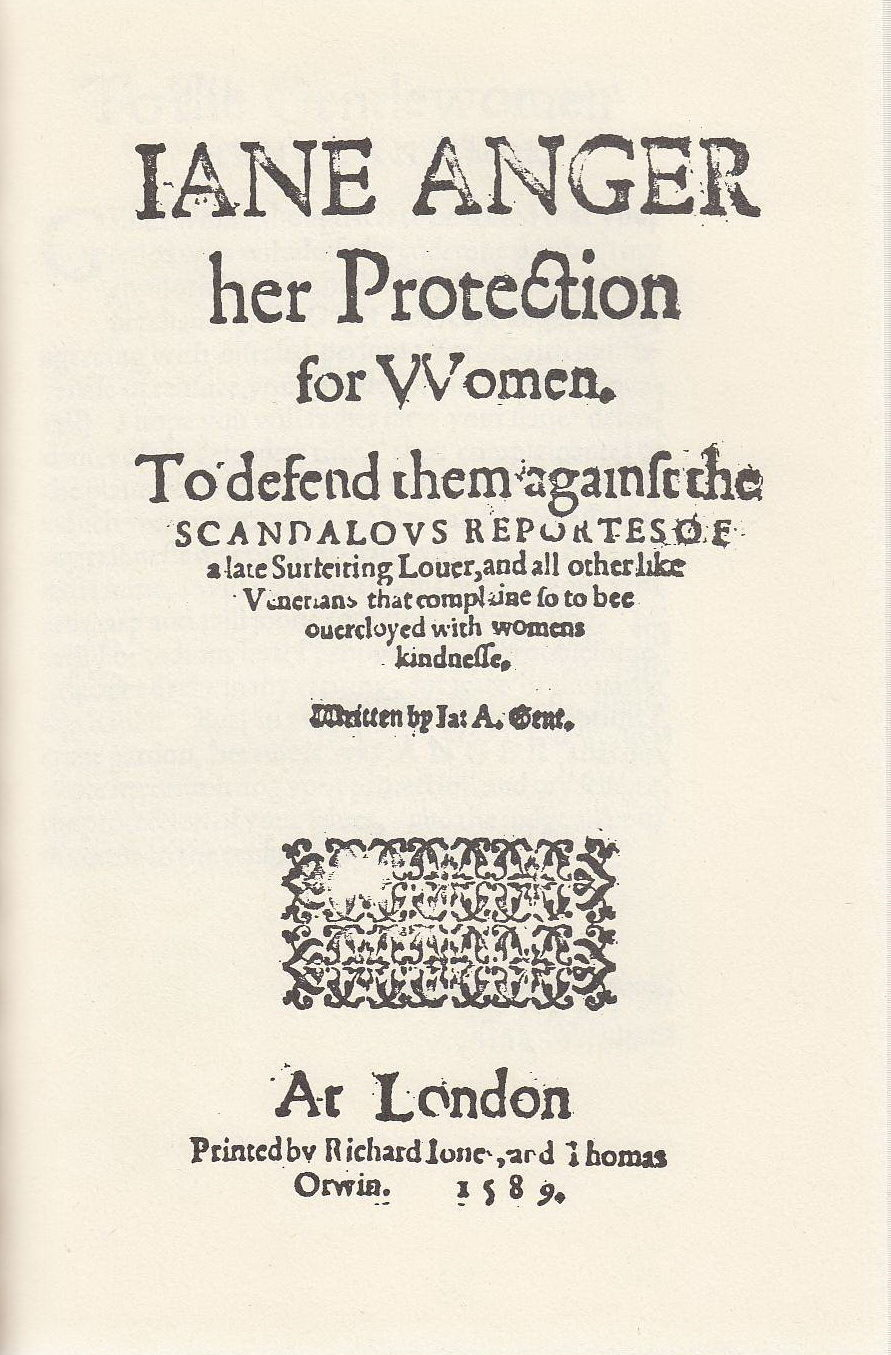
The title page of Jane Anger her Protection for Women

Scholars know virtually nothing about Jane Anger's life. Jane Anger is known only as the writer of the pamphlet, Jane Anger Her Protection for Women (1589). There was more than one Jane Anger living in England at the time, however, none of them have been identified as the writer of the pamphlet. According to Moira Ferguson, the history of surnames for this period suggest that her surname was probably derived from the Anglicized French "Anjou". Anne Prescott argues that, presumably, the Jo. Anger, whose poem on the author appears at the end of the volume, was a relative or spouse. Others have suggested that "Jane Anger" was the pseudonym of a male writer. Other evidence suggests that Jane Anger may be a real woman, not a "ventriloquising man," and her work breaks free from gender limitations. In The Crooked Rib, Francis Lee Utley argues that the anonymous poem, "ye are to yong to bring me in: An old lover to a young gentlewoman" might have provoked Anger's sharp defense."

== Work ==
The pamphlet defends women and makes serious claims regarding women's authorship. For the first time, her text brought a distinctive new voice to English writing, which emphasized the voice of female anger. By developing this innovation, she "transformed the idea of masculine models of composition to invent a female writing style to suite to her enterprise." Some modern commentators argue that, "Anger deliberately reworks her opponent’s misogynist ideas to establish a direct feminine perspective that goes beyond the querelle frameworks." Since Jane Anger was the first major female polemicist in English, there is no doubt that Anger shows the interest and value in the creation of feminist consciousness, because in the Middle Ages, the feminist polemic was a favourite topic for academic disputation. Jane Anger's pamphlet, Her Protection of Women, (1589) was a response to the male-authored text of Thomas Orwin, Book His Surfeit in Love. Pamela Joseph Benson argues that, "the Protection remains undifferentiated from other interventions in the querelle because it relies largely on the traditional issue of sexual behaviour to evaluate woman’s moral nature." Anger's arguments are a compilation of allusions, sayings, and some examples that match to those in the Book his Surfeit. She exposes the mono-gendered basis of the Surfeiter's "objective" or "natural" assertions. Anger's text responds to the male-dominated rhetoric of the female gender, passionately defends and attacks the male writes' complaint stating that he is "surfeit", or "sick with sensual indulgence of women." Through defending her intervention in the debate, she constantly touches the reader's awareness that women were not confident enough to express their own opinions or "masculine" emotions. Her pamphlet opens with a critique of masculine rhetorical practices, especially paying an attention to their overemphasis on "manner" over "matter." She immediately targets a contradiction between the high value male writers, who place women as a stimulus to their creativity and the decline of women. She touches the notion of the mythmaking that accompanies men's claims to inspiration: "If they may one encroach so far into our presence as they may but see the lining of our outermost garment, they straight think that Apollo honours them." She describes the details of how men's ignorance of women allow them to misread women's behaviours, particularly, in regard to sex, she writes: "If we will not suffer them to smell on our smocks, they will snatch at our petticoats; but if our honest natures cannot away with that uncivil kind of jesting, then we are coy. Yet if w bear with their rudeness and be somewhat modestly familiar with them, they will straight make matter of nothing, blazing abroad that they have surfeited with love, and …telling the manner how." Jane Anger describes her work as "that which my chooloricke vaine hath rashly set downe…it was ANGER that did write it." The first "epistle" is devoted to Gentlewomen making an apology for a female's choleric directness. In the second "epistle" she blames "railing" male speech: Fie on the falshoode of men, whose minds goe off a madding, & whose tongues can not so soone be wagging, but straight they fal a railing...shall not Anger stretch the vaines of her braines, the stringes of her fingers, and the listes of her modestie, to answere theire Surfeitings: Yes truly. Then, using the Surfeiter's own vein, she uses the comic potential in the discourse, which enables her readers to laugh at her, as well as at the Surfeiter. Thus, "it confirms the misogynist reading of women who speak out as shrewish." She uses a female speech as comically baffling and witty in its echoes of logical and scholastic discourse:

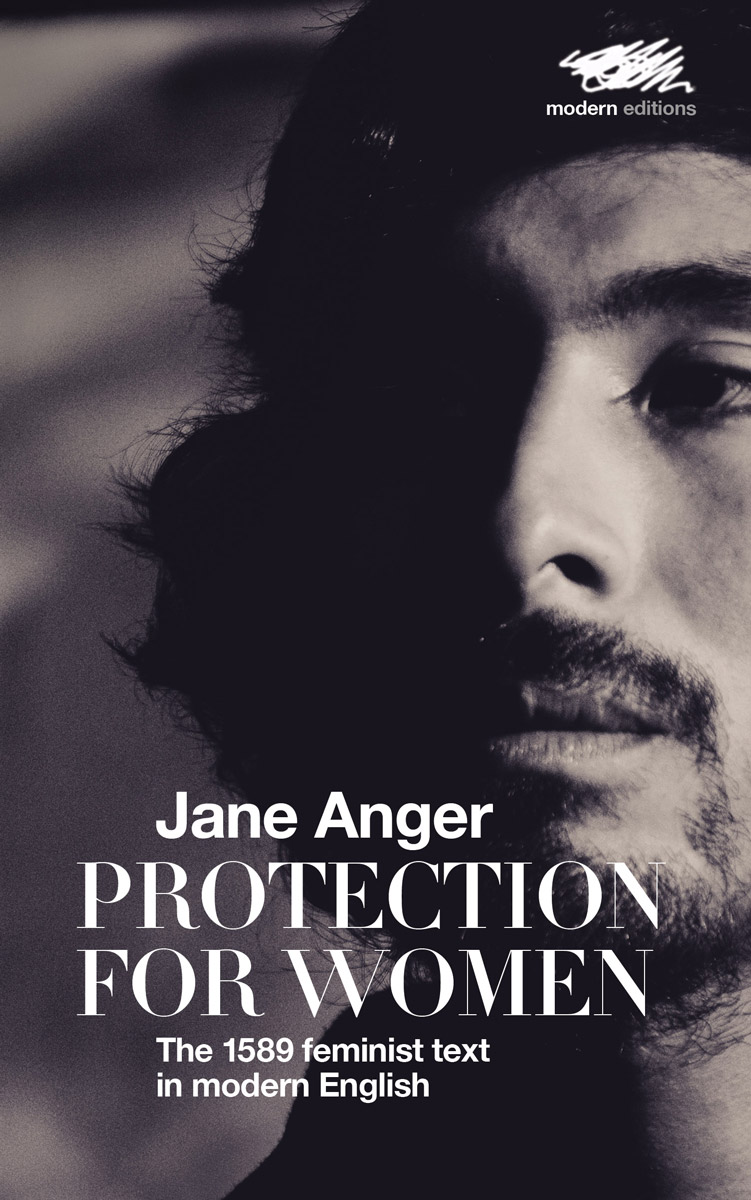
Cover of 'Protection for Women' by Jane Anger in a modern English translation, published 2019.

Give me leave like a scoller to prove our wisdom more excellent then theirs, hough I never knew what sophistry ment. There is no wisdom but it comes by grace, this is a principles & Contra principium non est disputandum: but grace was first given to a woman, because to our lady: which premises conclude that women are wise. Now Primus est optimum, & therefore, women are wiser then men. That we are more witty which comes by nature, it connot better be proved, then that by our answers, men are often driven to Non plus.

Importantly, Anger repeatedly points out that men continue to misinterpret women because male writers "assume" that women are not capable of entering the male sphere of the printed word to challenge them: "their slanderous tongues are so short, that the time wherein they have lavished out their words freely hath been so long, and they know we cannot catch hold of them to pull them out, and they think we will not write to reprove their lying lips." Anger tries to answer some general male charges against the looseness of women's moral, arguing that men's own "filthy lust" causes them to "invent" an idea of women's lascivious nature. Above all, as the counter argument to the Surfeiter's account that women seduce men only to make the men's lives miserable, Anger proposes her own story. According to Anger's view of courtship: that men prey on women, "If we clothe ourselves in sackcloth, and truss up our hair in dishclouts, Venerians will nevertheless pursue their pastime. If we hide our breasts, it must be with leather, for no cloth can keep their long nails out off our bosoms." Anger's way of caricaturing the Surfeiter allowed her to produce an imaginative and unique piece of writing. At the end of her pamphlet, though Anger blames the Surfeiter for his views, she admits the fact that she had the pleasure using his style. Anger's work is full of misogynist materials, which were circulating in popular prose romances of her time, including some of Greene's and John Lyly's works. Scholars have their own interpretations whether she should be called "feminist," "protofeminist," or "prowoman," but her work definitely opened up a new possibility for women writers of the sixteenth century.

A sample from Jane Anger's Her Protection for Women

Fie on the falsehood of men, whose minds go oft a –madding and whose tongues cannot so soon be wagging but straight they fall a-railing. Was there ever any so abused, so slandered, so railed upon, or so wickedly handled undeservedly, as are we women? Will the gods permit it, the goddesses stay their punishing judgements, and we ourselves not pursue their undoings for such devilish practices? O Paul's steeple and Charing Cross!

== Historical context ==
There was a lack of formal educational institutions for girls during the early modern times, but it did not prevent some early modern women from acquiring their reading and writing skills. Laura Knoppers suggests that informal education for girls took place in multiple spaces and ways. The early women writers used three handwriting styles: italic, secretary, and mixed. The writing process was linked with the reading of the books. Because many books were expensive, some women personally copied them and made their own writing in the margins of a book. Throughout the early modern period, many women tend to choose manuscript writings and circulation for their diaries, travelling journals, recipe books, religious and personal devotional writing, and miscellanies. Knoppers argues that miscellanies writings include women's authorship and response to texts. Some early feminist studies suggest that women's writing process began in the home, because in the early modern period, their homes were considered to be a place of work and business. Importantly, Knoppers argues that, "architectural spaces within the household as well as such places as the royal courts, churches and law courts generated and shaped women’s writing." In the early modern period, most of the educational spaces for girls were found within the household, which helped women to be engaged in writing about cookery, carving, and needlework. Many women writers' voice openly show their support for gender and class hierarchies. A gender issue was a primary motive for women's writing, which included politics, religion, class, ethnicity, and practical affairs. As Jane Anger, many women writers wrote to defend themselves and their reputations through legal contexts and various domestic forms of life-writing. The reasons for their writing were various, many women writers wrote for themselves, on behalf of and to their family members, or simply for devotional purposes. Despite the fact that education was not available for early modern women, they were able to find multiple ways of writing and of circulating their work.

== In literature, media and popular culture ==
Jane Anger served as an inspiration for and is a primary character in Talene Monahon's play Jane Anger, or, The Lamentable Comedie of Jane Anger, that Cunning Woman, and also of Willy Shakespeare and his Peasant Companion, Francis, Yes and also of Anne Hathaway (Also a Woman) Who Tried Very Hard. Monahon's dark comedy had its world premiere at the New Ohio Theatre in New York City in March 2022.

== General references ==
- Anger, Jane (1589). Her Protection For Women To Defend Them Against The Scandalous Reportes of a Late Surfeiting Lover, and All Other Like Venerians that Complaine so to be Overcloyed With Women's Kidness. London: Richard Jones and Thomas Orwin.
- Furguson, Moira (1985). First Feminists: British Women Writers 1578-1799. Bloomngdale: Indiana University Press. pp. 58–73.
- Magnusson, Lynne A (1994). Dictionary of Literary Biography: Jane Anger (flourished 1589). Sixteenth-Century British Nondramatic Writers.
- Knoppers, Laura (2009). The Cambridge Companion to Early Modern Women's Writing. Cambridge: Cambridge University Press.
- Randall, Martin (1997). Women Writers in Renaissance England: An Annotated Anthology. Britain: Pearson Education Ltd.
- Utley, Francis Lee (1944). The Crooked Rib. An Analytical Index to the Argument about Women in English and Scots Literature to the End of the Year 1568. Columbus, Ohio: Ohio State University.
- Ritchie, Joy; Ronald, Kate (2001). "Jane Anger" From Jane Anger Her Protection for Women…(1589). In Available Means: An Anthology of Women's Rhetoric(s). Pennsylvania: University of Pittsburgh Press.
- Prescott, Anne Lake (14 April 2007). Anger, Jane (fl. 1588). Oxford: Oxford Dictionary of National Biography.
