= Louis Anger =

American studio executive (1878–1946)

Lou Anger
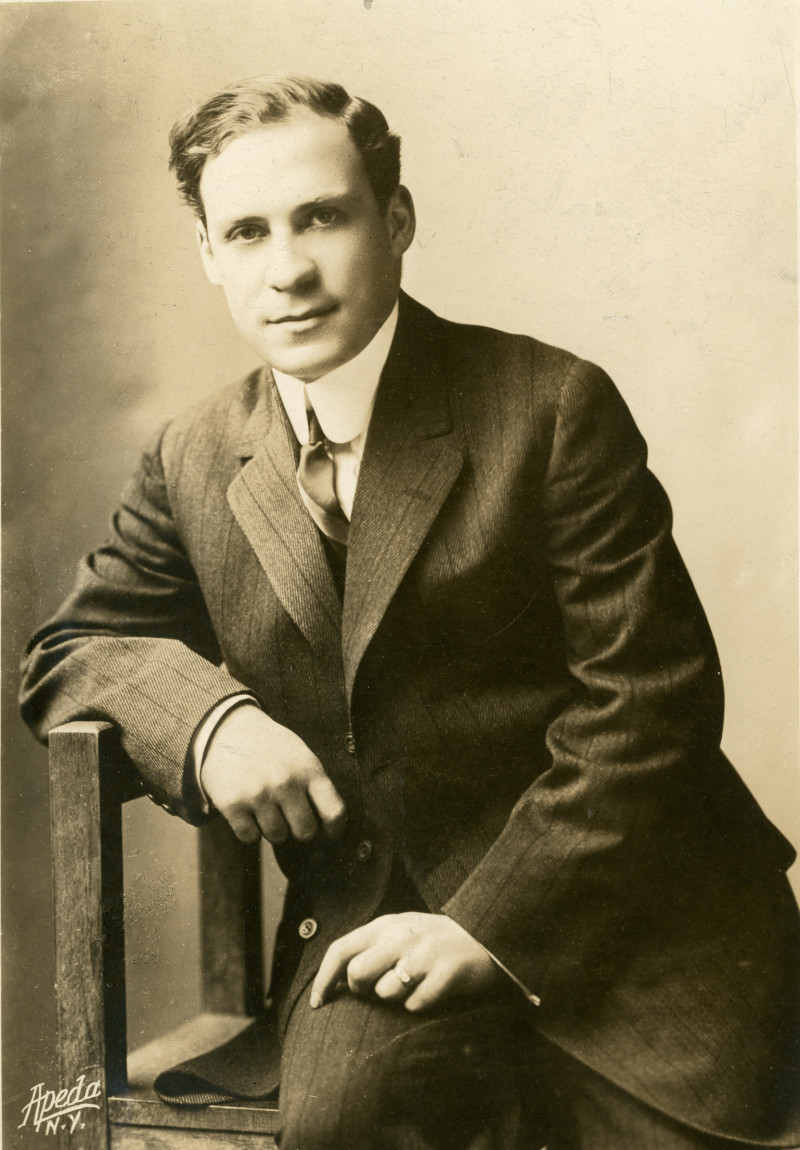
- Anger in 1911
- Born: February 12, 1878; Philadelphia, Pennsylvania, U.S.
- Died: May 21, 1946 (aged 68); Los Angeles, California, U.S.
- Resting place: Forest Lawn Memorial Park, Glendale, California
- Occupations: Movie studio executive; vaudeville performer
- Years active: 1908–1939
- Spouse: Sophye Anger

Louis Anger (February 12, 1878 – May 21, 1946) was an American vaudeville performer and movie studio executive. During the early days of the American silent film industry, Anger was considered to be "the king of slapstick comedy producers," and was instrumental in developing the film careers of famed actors Fatty Arbuckle and Buster Keaton.

== Early life ==
The youngest of six children Anger was born into a poor immigrant family in Philadelphia. His father, Hermann Anger, had immigrated to the U.S. on June 1, 1854, from Prussia when he was 27 years old. His mother, Lena Adler, came from Bavaria. Hermann worked as a peddler and traveled thought the Eastern U.S. before settling in Philadelphia.

== Vaudeville ==
Anger started out in show business in burlesque. He teamed with vaudevillian Henry Dixon in a "Dutch" comedy act, which meant they were playing broad stereotypes of German characters. In 1908, Anger struck out on his own with a monologue called "The German Soldier." Variety said of his act, "Anger is a clever dialectician and delivers his stories to make the points count... soldier life in the Government's employ and history of famous battles are used as the base of his stories with a plentiful supply of tangle talk... the audience was convulsed.". The Los Angeles Times agreed, calling his act "excellent folly, well worth listening to three or four times, and Lou enters his part so perfectly that he almost exhales beer and sauerkraut." The Duluth Herald praised Anger, saying "Anger is one of the best comedians who ever mangled the English language."

Anger appeared in stage musicals too. His first role was in "The Gay Hussars" in 1910. There he met Sophye Barnard. They married a few weeks later, on June 22, at the home of Lou's sister Adeline in Chicago.

In 1913 Anger was third on the bill, after Gaby Deslys and Al Jolson, in "The Honeymoon Express" at the Winter Garden on Broadway. Fanny Brice was also in the cast. The New York Times wrote "audience goes wild over Honeymoon Express" and it ran for 156 performances.

In 1914, with the beginning of World War 1, Anger changed his solo act. The title became "The Neutral Soldier" and he described what would happen after the war: the leaders will have all the glory while the soldier who did the fighting will be chopping down a tree to make a wooden leg.

In 1915, Barnard and Anger played in a review called "Safety First." The plot managed to combine a phony movie-producing company, a burlesque battlefield scene for Anger's soldier character, several interruptions by a kicking chorus line and plenty of songs for Barnard. Philadelphia's Evening Public Ledger reported that the audience "enjoyed the act immensely and demanded a number of bows".

At one time Anger also had an act in which he appeared in black face.

== Film ==
By 1916 Anger had moved to the business side of entertainment. After a stint at the Reelcraft Film Corporation, where he headed up the Cincinnati and Indianapolis offices, he was hired by movie executive Joseph Schenck. One day, while movie comedian Fatty Arbuckle was filming a movie in New Jersey, Anger managed to pass through the tight security and approach Arbuckle during a break in filming. On behalf of Schenck, Anger offered Arbuckle the opportunity to form the Comique Film Corporation. Arbuckle would have total script and cast control and would receive a salary of $5000 per week, in addition to a percentage of the profit and a signing bonus of a new Rolls-Royce Silver Ghost touring car. This made Arbuckle the most powerful and highly-paid film comedian in America.

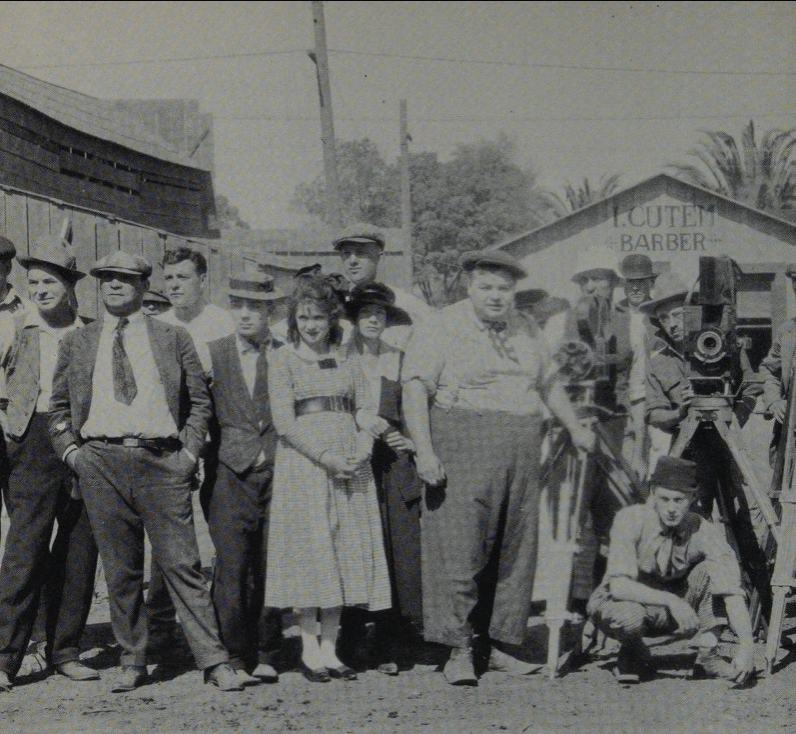
Comique Film Corporation on location. Lou Anger (second from left, with tie and hat) stands next to Buster Keaton. Fatty Arbuckle is front and center with his hand on the tripod.

The Comique Film Corporation operated autonomously under Anger's direction, with no interference from Schenk or a board of directors. The staff evolved plots, requisitioned funds and rolled out a two-reel shot every five to seven weeks. Schenck distributed them and the unit made money hand over fist.

In March 1917, Anger was in New York and ran into Buster Keaton, an old friend from his vaudeville days. Anger talked Keaton into coming along for a visit to Joe Schenck's studio on the Lower East Side where Arbuckle made his two-reel comedies. Arbuckle invited Keaton to do a bit in a scene and it was this meeting that propelled Keaton into the movie business. He went to work for the Comique Film Corporation for $40 a week, eventually appearing in 14 Arbuckle movies. Keaton proved to be so popular that, within two years, he had his own company and was an international star.

On the advice of Anger, Schenck acquired the Balboa Studio and moved the Comique Film Corporation to Long Beach, California. Anger continued to represent Arbuckle as business manager and confident. According to a 1919 Los Angeles Herald article "you will hear Lou Anger at the studio pattering around overhead with bills and discounts and other things and wondering if such and so comes F.O.B., C.O.D. or C.O.N., the latter meaning "Cash on the Nail." In 1918 Keaton and Arbuckle wanted to buy a gravel pit and it was Anger who talked them out of it, suggesting they would be better off to invest in movies, not in gravel pits, which they knew nothing about. This would normally have been good advice, except the next year oil was discovered on the property which would have made the men millionaires. Anger did convince Arbuckle to invest in stock and other real estate. Anger was also responsible for marketing a new product Arbuckle financially backed: the Olin stage brace. This new clamp eliminated the use of nails in building movie sets and resulted in the savings of hundreds of thousands of dollars each year by movie producers.

Arbuckle's wife, Minta Durfee, believed that Anger was actually more like a Svengali to Arbuckle than a manager and that he controlled Arbuckle like a puppet. Anger drew 20% of Arbuckle's salary and she claimed that Anger was clearly pulling all the strings regarding Arbuckle's career, while also trying to break up their marriage. However, during the Arbuckle scandal in 1921, in which the comedian was charged for the manslaughter of Virginia Rappe, it was Anger who visited him in jail. Following Arbuckle's acquittal in a series of trials, Anger became trustee of Arbuckle's estate as most of his possessions were sold off to pay for legal fees. Later Anger and his wife rented Arbuckle's home for themselves and allowed Arbuckle to stay there as well.

Anger became president of Buster Keaton studios in 1920 and was best man at Keaton's wedding to Natalie Talmadge, in 1921. Anger was given much credit for Keaton's success in film as "he surrounded Buster with a group of men who knew the game." Anger also hired Virginia Fox to star in a number of films with Keaton, primarily because she met the necessary requirements: "small enough to stand under Keaton's arm, also agile, beautiful and youthful."

In 1923 he formed Lou Anger productions, under the banner of United Artists, with a capital of $1 million to produce two-reel comedies. In 1928, Anger resigned from U.A. to join a private real-estate firm.

Later, Anger returned to United Artists for the rest of his career. He became vice president of the theatre chain and also represented Joe Schenk's interests in projects such as the Roosevelt Hotel, the UA theatre at Broadway and Wilshire and the Talmadge Apartment house, where Anger and his wife resided. Anger also purchased theatres on his own around the country, such as the 636-seat Barnum Theatre in Bridgeport, Connecticut.

With his wife Sophye, Anger was active in Hollywood social circles and was apparently well-liked. Once, after having just recovered from a sick spell, he was "cheered lustily" when discovered to be "sitting like a yiddisher Buddha" at the Blossom Room in the Roosevelt Hotel.

== Other business interests ==
In addition to his film activities, Anger took a deep interest in sports. He advised Arbuckle to invest in a minor league baseball team, the Vernon Tigers, of which Anger functioned as president during the year it won the Pacific Coast League Championship. For a time, Anger was part owner of the San Francisco based Mission Reds minor league team.

With Keaton, Anger also entered into several business ventures, such as the purchase of several oil wells near Long Beach, which were sold for a 100% profit.

Among his real estate ventures, Anger headed a group of investors who acquired Lido Isle, a 120-acre mound of sand near Newport Beach for the sum of $3 million. The plan was, in the words of Anger, "to develop an estate of 1400 homes that will rival the pleasure resorts of the Mediterranean." Lido Isle was one of the first master planned communities in California and today is home to 1,800 people.

In the late 1930s Anger owned the Agua Caliente Racetrack in Tijuana for a year. Aqua Caliente had been in decline but under Anger's leadership found its racing restored to a high degree of popularity. He resigned as president and General Manager of the race track in 1939.

== Death ==
Anger died in Los Angeles on May 21, 1946, after a long illness, a victim of dermatomyositis, and is interred at Forest Lawn Cemetery in Glendale, California. He left his entire estate, valued at $400,000 ($6,604,096 in current dollar terms) to his wife Sophye.
