= Dartmouth Medal =

- Awarded for: A reference work of outstanding quality and significance
- Country: United States
- Presented by: Reference and User Services Association (RUSA), a division of the American Library Association (ALA)
- First award: 1975
- Website: rusaupdate.org/awards/dartmouth-medal/

The Dartmouth Medal of the American Library Association is awarded annually to a reference work of outstanding quality and significance, published during the previous calendar year. The medal was designed by Rudolph Ruzicka.

== History ==
Dartmouth College sponsored the establishment of the award in 1974, acting on the recommendation of Dean Lathem, a Dartmouth College librarian, who had noted that no special honor existed in the United States for distinguished achievement relating to the creation of works of reference resources centrally important to libraries and to the pursuit of learning. Dartmouth College gave the American Library Association complete control in making the award and commissioned the artist Rudolph Ruzicka to design an oval bronze medal that features Athena, the goddess of wisdom.

== Dartmouth Medal recipients ==
Dartmouth Medal Recipients
| Year | Award | Editor-in-Chief | Book title or other citation | Publisher |
|---|---|---|---|---|
| 1975 | Dartmouth Medal | (New England Board of Higher Education) | "NASIC, Northeast Academic Science Information Center, a regional experiment in the brokerage of information services." | (New England Board of Higher Education) |
| 1976 | no award | | | |
| 1977 | Dartmouth Medal | Lester J. Cappon | Atlas of Early American History: The Revolutionary Era, 1760-1790 | Princeton University Press for the Newberry Library and the Institute of Early American History and Culture |
| 1978 | Dartmouth Medal | Benjamin B. Wolman | International Encyclopedia of Psychiatry, Psychology, Psychoanalysis and Neurology | Aesculapius Publishers by Van Nostrand Reinhold |
| 1979 | Dartmouth Medal | Warren Reich | Encyclopedia of Bioethics | Free Press |
| 1980 | no award | | | |
| 1981 | Dartmouth Medal | Charles Coulston Gillispie | Dictionary of Scientific Biography | Charles Scribner's Sons |
| 1982 | Dartmouth Medal | Stanley Sadie | The New Grove Dictionary of Music and Musicians | Grove's Dictionaries of Music |
| 1983 | Dartmouth Medal | (Congressional Information Service) | "The body of its reference works which provide exceptional access to current and retrospective publications of the United States Government and to statistical publications from a wide variety of sources." | (Congressional Information Service) |
| 1984 | Dartmouth Medal | Alastair Couper | Times Atlas of the Oceans | Van Nostrand Reinhold |
| 1985 | Dartmouth Medal | | Wilsonline | H. W. Wilson Company |
| 1986 | Dartmouth Medal | Torsten Husén and T. Neville Postlethwaite | International Encyclopedia of Education: Research and Studies | Pergamon Press |
| 1987 | Dartmouth Medal | Leonard W. Levy | Encyclopedia of the American Constitution | Macmillan Publishers |
| 1988 | Dartmouth Medal | Mircea Eliade | Encyclopedia of Religion | Macmillan Publishers |
| 1989 | Dartmouth Medal | James Paul Allen and Eugene James Turner | We the People: An Atlas of America's Diversity | Macmillan Publishers |
| 1990 | Dartmouth Medal | Charles Reagan Wilson and William Ferris | Encyclopedia of Southern Culture | University North Carolina Press |
| 1990 | Honorable Mention | Joseph R. Strayer | Dictionary of the Middle Ages | Charles Scribner's Sons |
| 1991 | Dartmouth Medal | Israel Gutman | Encyclopedia of the Holocaust | Macmillan Publishers |
| 1991 | Honorable Mention | William H. Gerdts | Art Across America: Two Centuries of Regional Painting, 1710-1920 | Abbeville Press |
| 1992 | Dartmouth Medal | Robert J. Mason and Mark T. Mattson | Atlas of United States Environmental Issues | Macmillan Publishers |
| 1992 | Honorable Mention | Eric Foner and John A. Garraty | The Reader's Companion to American History | Houghton Mifflin |
| 1993 | Dartmouth Medal | Edgar F. Borgatta | Encyclopedia of Sociology | Macmillan Publishers |
| 1993 | Honorable Mention | Tom McArthur | Oxford Companion to the English Language | Oxford University Press |
| 1994 | Dartmouth Medal | Darlene Clark Hine | Black Women in America: An Historical Encyclopedia | Carlson Publishers |
| 1994 | Honorable Mention | Mary Kupiec Cayton, Elliott J. Gorn, Peter W. Williams | Encyclopedia of American Social History | Charles Scribner's Sons |
| 1995 | Dartmouth Medal | Leonard W. Levy, Louis Fisher | Encyclopedia of the American Presidency | Simon & Schuster |
| 1995 | Honorable Mention | Kurt Gänzl | Encyclopedia of the Musical Theatre | Schirmer Books |
| 1996 | Dartmouth Medal | Jack M. Sasson | Civilizations of the Ancient Near East | Macmillan Publishers / Charles Scribner's Sons |
| 1996 | Honorable Mention | Warren Thomas Reich | Encyclopedia of Bioethics | Macmillan Publishers |
| 1996 | Honorable Mention | Kenneth T. Jackson | Encyclopedia of New York City | Yale University Press |
| 1997 | Dartmouth Medal | Jane Turner | Dictionary of Art | Macmillan Publishers |
| 1997 | Honorable Mention | Jack Salzman, David Lionel Smith, Cornel West | Encyclopedia of African-American Culture and History | Macmillan Library Reference |
| 1997 | Honorable Mention | | The Middle Ages: An Encyclopedia for Students | Charles Scribner's Sons |
| 1997 | Honorable Mention | Barbara A. Tenenbaum | Encyclopedia of Latin American History and Culture | Charles Scribner's Sons |
| 1998 | Dartmouth Medal | Paula E. Hyman and Deborah Dash Moore | Jewish Women in America: An Historical Encyclopedia | Routledge |
| 1998 | Honorable Mention | John Middleton | Encyclopedia of Africa: South of the Sahara | Charles Scribner's Sons |
| 1998 | Honorable Mention | Ruth M. Stone | Garland Encyclopedia of World Music: Africa | Garland Publishing |
| 1998 | Honorable Mention | | Encyclopedia Judaica on CD-ROM | Judaica Multimedia |
| 1999 | Dartmouth Medal | John A. Garraty and Mark C. Carnes | American National Biography | Oxford University Press |
| 1999 | Honorable Mention | Selma Jeanne Cohen | International Encyclopedia of Dance | Oxford University Press |
| 1999 | Honorable Mention | Edward Craig | Routledge Encyclopedia of Philosophy | Routledge |
| 1999 | Honorable Mention | Saul B. Cohen | Columbia Gazetteer of the World | Columbia University Press |
| 2000 | Dartmouth Medal | Paul F. Grendler | Encyclopedia of the Renaissance | Charles Scribner's Sons |
| 2000 | Honorable Mention | John G. Webster | Wiley Encyclopedia of Electrical and Electronics Engineering | John Wiley & Sons |
| 2000 | Honorable Mention | Samuel A. Floyd Jr. | International Dictionary of Black Composers | Fitzroy Dearborn Publishers |
| 2000 | Honorable Mention | Alan Davidson | Oxford Companion to Food | Oxford University Press |
| 2001 | Dartmouth Medal | Anne Commire | Women in World History | Gale |
| 2001 | Honorable Mention | David S. Heidler and Jeanne T. Heidler | Encyclopedia of the American Civil War | ABC-CLIO |
| 2001 | Honorable Mention | Jay A. Siegel | Encyclopedia of Forensic Sciences | Academic Press |
| 2002 | Dartmouth Medal | Donald B. Redford | Oxford Encyclopedia of Ancient Egypt | Oxford University Press |
| 2002 | Honorable Mention | Stanley Sadie; executive editor, John Tyrrell | New Grove Dictionary of Music and Musicians | Grove's Dictionaries of Music |
| 2003 | Dartmouth Medal | Bruno Nettl and Ruth M. Stone; founding editors, James Porter and Timothy Rice | Garland Encyclopedia of World Music | Routledge |
| 2004 | Dartmouth Medal | Solomon H. Katz | Encyclopedia of Food and Culture | Charles Scribner's Sons |
| 2004 | Honorable Mention | S. Lillian Kremer | Holocaust Literature: An Encyclopedia of Writers and Their Work | Routledge |
| 2005 | Dartmouth Medal | H. C. G. Matthew and Brian Harrison | Oxford Dictionary of National Biography | Oxford University Press |
| 2006 | Dartmouth Medal | Ian Aitken | Encyclopedia of the Documentary Film | Routledge / Taylor & Francis |
| 2006 | Honorable Mention | Suzanne Oboler and Deena J. González | Oxford Encyclopedia of Latinos and Latinas in the United States | Oxford University Press |
| 2007 | Dartmouth Medal | Fred Skolnik | Encyclopaedia Judaica | Gale |
| 2007 | Honorable Mention | Susan B. Carter, et al. | Historical Statistics of the United States: Earlier Times to the Present: Millennial Edition | Cambridge University Press |
| 2008 | Dartmouth Medal | John B. Hattendorf | Oxford Encyclopedia of Maritime History | Oxford University Press |
| 2009 | Dartmouth Medal | | Pop Culture Universe (online database pop.greenwood.com) | Greenwood Publishing Group |
| 2009 | Honorable Mention | Gershon David Hundert | The YIVO Encyclopedia of Jews in Eastern Europe | Yale University Press |
| 2010 | Dartmouth Medal | David Forsythe | Encyclopedia of Human Rights | Oxford University Press |
| 2010 | Honorable Mention | David Pong | The Encyclopedia of Modern China | Gale |
| 2010 | Honorable Mention | Christopher Sterling | The Encyclopedia of Journalism | Sage Reference |
| 2011 | Dartmouth Medal | Joanne Eicher | Encyclopedia of World Dress and Fashion and the online Berg Fashion Library | Bloomsbury Publishing |
| 2011 | Honorable Mention | David Eltis and David Richardson | Atlas of the Transatlantic Slave Trade | Yale University Press |
| 2012 | Dartmouth Medal | Jonathon Green | Green's Dictionary of Slang | Chambers |
| 2012 | Honorable Mention | Bertrand Badie, Dirk Berg-Schlosser, Leonardo Morlino | International Encyclopedia of Political Science | SAGE reference in association with the International Political Science Association |
| 2012 | Lifetime Achievement Award | | Statistical Abstract of the United States | U.S. Department of Commerce |
| 2013 | Dartmouth Medal | Frederic G. Cassidy, and Joan Houston Hall, ed. | Dictionary of American Regional English | Belknap Press |
| 2013 | Honorable Mention | Roger S. Bagnall, ed. | Encyclopedia of Ancient History | Wiley-Blackwell |
| 2014 | Dartmouth Medal | Jonathan Kingdon, David Happold, Thomas Butynski, Michael Hoffmann, Meredith Happold, Jan Kalina | Mammals of Africa | Bloomsbury Natural History |
| 2014 | Honorable Mention | | International Encyclopedia of Ethics | Wiley-Blackwell |
| 2014 | Honorable Mention | | Encyclopedia of Caribbean Religions | University of Illinois Press |
| 2015 | Dartmouth Medal | Robert E. Buswell Jr. & Donald S. Lopez Jr. | Princeton Dictionary of Buddhism | Princeton University Press |
| 2016 | Dartmouth Medal | Brent Strawn, editor-in-chief | Oxford Encyclopedia of the Bible and Law | Oxford University Press |
| 2016 | Honorable Mention | Thomas Riggs, editor | Worldmark Global Business and Economy Issues | Gale |
| 2017 | Dartmouth Medal | Gillian Vogelsang-Eastwood | Encyclopedia of Embroidery from the Arab World | Bloomsbury Academic |
| 2017 | Honorable Mention | Franklin W. Knight and Henry Louis Gates Jr. | Dictionary of Caribbean and Afro-Latin American Biography | Oxford University Press |
| 2018 | Dartmouth Medal | Theodore Levin, Saida Daukeyeva, and Elmira Köchümkulova | The Music of Central Asia | Indiana University Press |
| 2018 | Honorable Mention | Douglas Richardson | The International Encyclopedia of Geography: People, the Earth, Environment, and Technology | Wiley-Blackwell and the American Association of Geographers |
| 2018 | Honorable Mention | Andrea Carandini | The Atlas of Ancient Rome | Princeton University Press |
| 2019 | Dartmouth Medal | Brian W. Coad and James D. Reist | Marine Fishes of Arctic Canada | University of Toronto Press |
| 2019 | Honorable Mention | Stephen Marshall | Beetles: The Natural History and Diversity of Coleoptera | Firefly Books |
| 2019 | Honorable Mention | John Liontas | TESOL Encyclopedia of English Language Teaching | Wiley-Blackwell |
| 2020 | Dartmouth Medal | Howard Chiang | Global Encyclopedia of Lesbian, Gay, Bisexual, Transgender, and Queer (LGBTQ) History | Gale |
| 2020 | Honorable Mention | James E. Brunson, III | Black Baseball, 1858-1900: A Comprehensive Record of the Teams, Players, Managers, Owners and Umpires | McFarland |
| 2020 | Honorable Mention | Thomas Couser and Susannah B. Mint | Disability Experiences: Memoirs, Autobiographies, and Other Personal Narratives | Gale |
| 2020 | Honorable Mention | Murray Fraser | Sir Banister Fletcher’s Global History of Architecture (21st ed.) | Bloomsbury Publishing |
| 2021 | Dartmouth Medal | Spencer C. Tucker | The Cold War: The Definitive Encyclopedia and Document Collection | ABC-Clio |
| 2021 | Honorable Mention | Colleen Boyett, H. Micheal Tarver, and Mildred Diane Gleason | Daily Life of Women: An Encyclopedia from Ancient Times to the Present | Greenwood |
| 2021 | Honorable Mention | Bob Gale, Pam Gale, and Ashby Gale | A Beachcomber’s Guide to Fossils | University of Georgia Press |
| 2021 | Honorable Mention | Norman I. Platnick, Gustavo Hormiga, Peter Jäger, Rudy Jocqué, Norman I. Platnic, Martín J. Ramírez, and Robert J. Raven | Spiders of the World: A Natural History | Princeton University Press |
| 2022 | Dartmouth Medal | David Wondrich with Noah Rothbaum | The Oxford Companion to Spirits and Cocktails | Oxford University Press |
| 2022 | Honorable Mention | Michael B. Montgomery and Jennifer K.N. Heinmiller | Dictionary of Southern Appalachian English | University of North Carolina Press |
| 2022 | Honorable Mention | Iain Campbell, Ken Behrens, Charley Hesse, and Phil Chaon | Habitats of the World: A Field Guide for Birders, Naturalists, and Ecologists | Princeton University Press |
| 2023 | Dartmouth Medal | Herman Shugart, Peter White, Sassan Saatchi, and Jérôme Chave | The World Atlas of Trees and Forests: Exploring Earth’s Forest Ecosystems | Princeton University Press |
| 2023 | Honorable Mention | Patrick Hanks and Simon Lenarčič with Peter McClure | Dictionary of American Family Names, 2nd Edition | Oxford University Press |
| 2023 | Honorable Mention | Glenn Bartley and Andy Swash | Hummingbirds: A Celebration of Nature’s Jewels | Princeton University Press |
| 2023 | Honorable Mention | Victoria Finlay | Fabric: Hidden History of the Material World | Pegasus Books |
| 2023 | Honorable Mention | Yvonne Wakim Dennis, Arlene Hirschfelder, and Paulette F. Molin | Indigenous Firsts: A History of Native American Achievement and Events | Visible Ink Press |
| 2024 | Dartmouth Medal | Stephen A. Marshall | Hymenoptera: The Natural History and Diversity of Wasps, Bees and Ants | Firefly Books |
| 2024 | Honorable Mention | Bowern, Claire (Editor) | Oxford Guide to Australian Languages | Oxford University Press |
| 2024 | Honorable Mention | Michael Shally-Jensen (Editor) | Critical Survey of Mythology & Folklore: Creation Myths | Salem Press |
| 2024 | Honorable Mention | Robert C. Evans (Editor) | Notable Writers of LGBTQ+ Literature | Salem Press |
| 2025 | Dartmouth Medal | Roger D. Launius | Smithsonian Atlas of Space: A Map to the Universe from the Big Bang to the Future | Smithsonian Books. |
| 2025 | Honorable Mention | Debbie Berne | Design of Books: An Explainer for Authors, Editors, Agents, and Other Curious Readers | University of Chicago Press |
| 2025 | Honorable Mention | Shadreck Chirikure | The Oxford Encyclopedia of African Archaeology | Oxford University Press |
| 2025 | Honorable Mention | Douglas G.D. Russell | Smithsonian Handbook of Interesting Bird Nests and Eggs | Smithsonian Books |
| 2025 | Honorable Mention | Jim Best, Stephen Darby, Luciana Esteves, and Carol Wilson | The World Atlas of Rivers, Estuaries, and Deltas | Princeton University Press |

== Sources ==
- American Library Association Reference and User Services Association
