= Doran H. Ross =

African art scholar, author, and museum curator (1947–2020)

- Born: October 17, 1947; Fresno, California
- Died: September 16, 2020 (aged 72); Los Angeles, California
- Occupation(s): Curator and Director of Fowler Museum at UCLA
- Website: ACASA

Doran H. Ross (October 17, 1947 – September 16, 2020) was an African art scholar, author, and museum director and curator. Ross was a renowned Ghanaian arts scholar who spent 20 years at the Fowler Museum at UCLA managing or curating nearly 40 African and African-American exhibitions shown at 30 venues across the country. His specialties included Ghanaian art, including Asafo flags, gold, elephant art forms, Asante regalia, and the works of Ghanaian painter Kwame Akoto (Almighty God).

== Early life ==
Ross was first introduced to African art as a student working on a double major in art history and psychology at California State University, Fresno. He received his M.A. in art history at University of California, Santa Barbara and went on to teach at various California institutions until beginning his career at the Fowler Museum in 1981 as associate director and Curator of Africa, Southeast Asia and Oceanic arts. He later became deputy director and Curator of African Collections, before becoming the first non-faculty full-time Director in 1996, a position he held until he retired in 2001.

== Career at the Fowler Museum ==
His first major exhibition at the Fowler (then the UCLA Museum of Cultural History) was The Arts of Ghana (1977), co-curated with Herbert M. Cole, which was accompanied by a comprehensive publication he co-authored. Doran was among the most important scholars of Ghanaian arts in the world with research interests that centered on the royal and military arts of the Akan peoples, especially their dress, adornment, and regalia. Among his Akan publication highlights are Akan Gold from the Glassell Collection (2002); Royal Arts of the Akan: West African Gold in Museum Liaunig (2009); Art, Honor and Ridicule: Fante Asafo Flags from Southern Ghana (2017) with Silvia Forni; and Akan Transformations: Problems in Ghanaian Art History (1983), which he edited.

Ross was largely responsible for setting the standard for the Fowler's highly researched, contextualized, and multi-media exhibitions of global arts, always paired with a scholarly volume, a paradigm that continues to this day. He was firmly committed to a team approach for exhibition development, believing that exhibitions benefited from diverse perspectives beyond those of the erudite scholar. This was a methodology then considered novel, but one Ross saw as essential. Among the many highlights of his tenure were his contributions to the new Fowler Museum facility, designed and built in 1992. He signaled the new institution's ambition and vision with four simultaneous inaugural exhibitions (each with its book), including Elephant! The Animal and its Ivory in African Culture, which he curated.

== Other projects ==
Ross oversaw many other projects throughout his career. He managed and/or curated some 38 African and African-American exhibitions that were shown at 30 different venues nationally. For example, he spearheaded the Sacred Arts of Haitian Vodou project (1995), co-curated by Donald J. Cosentino and Marilyn Houlberg, which has since become one of the Fowler's most memorable exhibitions and publications. Ross curated the community-based project, Wrapped in Pride: Ghanaian Kente and African-American Identity (1991), an initiative that involved a year-long African art and field collecting course he co-taught with the Fowler's Director of Education Betsy Quick at Crenshaw High School. A smaller version of this exhibition, initiated and funded by NEH on the Road and co-organized with Quick, traveled to 35 community venues around the country. Over his term at the museum, Ross oversaw the acquisition of thousands of objects into its permanent collections. His years at the Fowler were also a time when the museum's national reputation as an innovator in exhibition development, engagement with community advisors, and the production of multi-author publications was established with authority. Many Fowler projects were funded by the National Endowment for the Humanities and it was Ross who set the stage for the museum's long and successful record of receiving major grants from this federal agency. During his years at UCLA, he also taught a three-quarter Museum Studies course, inspiring students to seek museum careers while mentoring graduate students at UCLA and elsewhere who benefited from his guidance. Inspired by his gratitude for his mentor and friend Skip Cole, Ross went out of his way throughout his career to assist and advise students, and to help them publish their research. Ross served as an editor of the UCLA journal African Arts from 1988 to 2015, and published 47 articles, reviews, First Words, In Memoria, and Portfolios in that journal from 1974 to 2014.

Ross also guest-curated numerous exhibitions both nationally and internationally, working with large and small institutions; and consulted on collections building, film projects, self-study institutional initiatives, federal grant reviews, and museum studies programs. Over a span of several years, he also worked closely with two important collections of Akan gold at the Museum of Fine Arts, Houston and Museum Liaunig in Austria.

== Honors and awards ==
- Received Arnold Rubin Book Award in 2001 for "Wrapped in Pride"
- Received ACASA Leadership Award in 2011, in recognition of his lifetime of excellence, innovative contributions and vision.

== Death ==
Ross died at his home in Los Angeles on September 16, 2023, after a long illness, aged 73.

== Legacy ==
As a great proponent of research and exhibitions on global textiles, he was also co-editor of Textile: the Journal of Cloth and Culture from 2002 to 2012 and editor of volume 1 (Africa), The Berg Encyclopedia of World Dress and Fashion (2010), both with Joanne B. Eicher. Ross was especially proud of the National Museum of Mali/UCLA Museum of Cultural History Joint Textile Collection and Documentation Project (1986–1992). While building collections for both institutions, he mandated that when questions of quality arose, the better example would be reserved for the National Museum of Mali, insisting that Africa come first.

Beyond Ross's direct responsibilities associated with UCLA and Fowler projects, he was extremely committed to helping institutions and individuals in Africa. From 1974 to his last trip in 2014, he made 37 research and development trips to 18 African countries. Following the joint collection project with the National Museum of Mali, he served on the Board of the West African Museums Project (1993–2000), a policy and programmatic initiative to which he was deeply committed. In addition, he served on the Selection Committee of the SSRC African Archives and Museums Project (1991–1996), was a member of the Arts and Artifacts Indemnity Advisory Panel of the NEA (1996–1999) and of the Advisory Committee of the Getty Leadership Institute (2000–2003).

In addition to writing and curating, building collections and consulting, he was also a lifelong student of film (his library numbered approximately 3,000 DVDs) and music, most especially western classical music, American jazz, and tradition-based and contemporary African music. His library included some 5,000 meticulously catalogued CDs.

Ross's participation in and promotion of the Arts Council of the African Studies Association was also very notable. He joined the Board in 1984 and served as Secretary/Treasurer (1984–87), was Program Chair for the 7th Triennial in 1986, became president in 1987–1989, received the Arnold Rubin Book award in 2001 for Wrapped in Pride, served on the Rubin Book Award and Leadership Award Committees, and received the ACASA Leadership Award in 2011. His support of ACASA never waned and he attended every Triennial Symposium from Washington, D.C., in 1977 to Brooklyn in 2014.

In recent years, Fowler staff worked with Ross on two exhibitions of Ghanaian art well represented in its collections: Art, Honor, and Ridicule: Fante Asafo Flags from Southern Ghana (an exhibition that opened at the Royal Ontario Museum in 2017 and was co-curated with Silvia Forni) and the paintings of Kwame Akoto (a.k.a. Almighty God).

== Publications ==
- Ross, Doran H. (1979). Fighting With Art: Appliqued Flags of the Fanto Asafo. Los Angeles, CA: UCLA Museum of Cultural History.
- Ross, Doran H. (1992). Elephant : The Animal and its Ivory in African Culture. University of California, Los Angeles. Fowler Museum of Cultural History. Los Angeles, Calif., USA: Fowler Museum of Cultural History, University of California, Los Angeles. ISBN 0-930741-25-0. OCLC 27035844.
- Ross, Doran H. (1998). Wrapped in Pride : Ghanaian Kente and African American Identity. Adedze, Agbenyega, Newark Museum, University of California, Los Angeles. Fowler Museum of Cultural History. Los Angeles, CA: UCLA Fowler Museum of Cultural History. ISBN 0-930741-68-4. OCLC 39905097.
- Cole, Herbert M., Ross, Doran H. The Arts of Ghana. Museum of Cultural History/University of California. Los Angeles, CA, USA: University of California, Los Angeles, 1977.
- Posnansky, Merrick; Ross, Doran H.; Garrard, Timothy F. (1984). "Akan Transformations: Problems in Ghanaian Art History". African Arts. 17 (2): 23. doi:10.2307/3336214. ISSN 0001-9933. JSTOR 3336214.
- (cont.) Ross, Doran H. 5000 years of popular culture : popular culture before printing. Schroeder, Fred E. H., 1932-. Bowling Green, Ohio: Bowling Green University Popular Press. 1980. ISBN 0-87972-147-2. OCLC 7172931.
- Museum of Fine Arts, Houston. (2002). Gold of the Akan from the Glassell collection. Ross, Doran H., Marzio, Frances. Houston, Tex.: Museum of Fine Arts, Houston. ISBN 0-89090-115-5. OCLC 50561876.
- Cameron, Elisabeth Lynn, Ross, Doran H., Isn't s/he a Doll? : Play and Ritual in African Sculpture. Los Angeles, California, USA. ISBN 0-930741-54-4. OCLC 35397907.
- Eicher, Joanne Bubolz, Ross, Doran H. (eds.). Encyclopedia of World Dress and Fashion. Oxford University Press. 2010. ISBN 978-0-19-537733-0. OCLC 428033198.
- The Power of Gold: Asante Royal Regalia from Ghana. Walker, Roslyn A., Ehrlich, Martha J., Geary, Christraud M., McLeod, Malcolm D., Ross, Doran H., Dallas Museum of Art, New Haven, 2018. ISBN 0-300-23304-3. OCLC 1032497725.

== Literature ==
- Abiodun, Rowland. "Doran – The Elephant-in-Chief". African Arts 55, no. 1 (2022): 7-7.
- Quarcoopome, Nii O., and Raymond Silverman. "Doran Ross: The Scholar of Akan Art". African Arts 55, no. 1 (2022): 20–25.
- Quick, Betsy D. "Doran H. Ross: Generosity. Intellect. Passion". African Arts 55, no. 1 (2022): 77–81.
