= Snowflake (slang) =

Pejoratively, an easily offended person

Snowflake is a derogatory slang term for a person, implying that they have an inflated sense of uniqueness, an unwarranted sense of entitlement, or are overly emotional, easily offended, and unable to deal with opposing opinions. The term gained prominence in the 2010s, and was declared by The Guardian in Britain to be the "defining insult of 2016", a term "thrown around with abandon in the wake of Brexit debate in the United Kingdom and the 2016 US election". Common usages include the terms "special snowflake", "Generation Snowflake", "Snowflake Generation" and "snowflake" as a politicized insult. In the past, it held different meanings in reference to white people.

== Origins of the allegoric meaning ==
It is popularly believed that every snowflake has a unique structure. Most usages of "snowflake" make reference to the physical qualities of snowflakes, such as their unique structure or fragility, while a minority of usages make reference to the white color of snow.

== Usages ==
=== Interracial relations ===
In the 1860s, "snowflake" was used by abolitionists in Missouri to refer to those who opposed the abolition of slavery. The term referred to the color of snow, referring to valuing white people over black people. This usage was not believed to have extended beyond the state of Missouri in the 1800s. In the 1970s, according to Green's Dictionary of Slang, snowflake has been used to describe "a white person or a black person who was perceived as acting too much like a white person".

=== Pejorative reference to uniqueness ===
Chuck Palahniuk has often been credited with originating the modern pejorative use of "snowflake" in his 1996 novel Fight Club, which contains the quote: "you are not special, you are not a beautiful and unique snowflake". The 1999 film adaptation also includes this line. In January 2017, Palahniuk directly claimed credit, adding that young adults of the 2010s exhibit "a kind of new Victorianism". In a short essay for Entertainment Weekly, Palahniuk later clarified that while writing the novel in 1994, he did not intend "snowflake" to be an insult, and said it had nothing to do with fragility or sensitivity. Rather he was consciously reacting against the constant praise he had encountered in the education system, which he said had rendered him an "idiot" and poorly equipped him for the world. He said "A lifetime of disingenuous, one-size-fits-all praise had kept most of my peers from pushing hard to achieve any actual triumphs, and therefore we had no internal sense of ability or potential." The metaphor has been used positively with students to celebrate their individuality (and teamwork).

Following Fight Club, the terms "special snowflake" and "special snowflake syndrome" were applied to individuals with a negative connotation. Such terminology refers to people who believe their status as a unique individual means they are destined for great success, or deserve a special career, with abundant praise and admiration. According to Merriam-Webster, in the 2000s snowflake referred "mostly to millennials who were allegedly too convinced of their own status as special and unique people to be able (or bothered) to handle the normal trials and travails of regular adult life".

=== "Generation Snowflake": reference to enhanced sensitivity ===
The term "Generation Snowflake" or "Snowflake Generation" was popularized by Claire Fox's 2016 book I Find That Offensive!. The book discussed a 2015 student/faculty confrontation at Yale University between university students and faculty head of college, Nicholas A. Christakis that was recorded and uploaded to YouTube. The video captured a disagreement regarding Halloween costumes and the degree to which Yale University should intervene over costumes which may be perceived as cultural appropriation. Fox described the video as showing a "screaming, almost hysterical mob of students" and that the backlash to the viral video led to the disparaging moniker "generation snowflake" for the students.

The term "snowflake generation" was one of Collins English Dictionary's 2016 words of the year. Collins defines the term as "the young adults of the 2010s, viewed as being less resilient and more prone to taking offence than previous generations". The terms "generation snowflake" and "snowflake generation" are frequently used in reference to use of trigger warnings and safe spaces, or to describe young adults as anti-free speech, specifically in reference to a practice referred to as deplatforming. It has also been used to refer to a reported increase in mental health issues among young adults.

=== Politicization ===
Following the referendum result in favour of Brexit in the UK and the election of Donald Trump as 45th President of the U.S., "generation snowflake" was often shortened to simply "snowflake" and became a politicized insult. A November 2016 article from The Guardian commented: "Until very recently, to call someone a snowflake would have involved the word 'generation'." Snowflake as a politicized insult is typically used by those on the political right to insult those on the political left. In an article from the Los Angeles Times, Jessica Roy says the alt-right in the United States pejoratively describes most liberals and those protesting against Donald Trump as "snowflakes". A 2017 article from Think Progress commented: "The insult expanded to encompass not just the young, but liberals of all ages; it became the epithet of choice for right-wingers to fling at anyone who could be accused of being too easily offended, too in need of 'safe spaces, too fragile'". Jonathon Green, editor of Green's Dictionary of Slang, points out snowflake is an unusual insult in that it calls someone weak and fragile without using misogynistic or homophobic references.

Actor George Takei extended the metaphor to emphasize the power of snowflakes, saying: "The thing about 'snowflakes' is this: They are beautiful and unique, but in large numbers become an unstoppable avalanche that will bury you." Others have returned the insult back at those with right-wing politics, arguing "oversensitive whiners can be found all over the political spectrum" including President Trump. Comedian Neal Brennan referred to Donald Trump as "the biggest snowflake in America", while a January 2017 opinion piece from The Guardian refers to President Trump as "Snowflake-in-Chief" and CNN commentator Anthony Kapel "Van" Jones called Trump "President Snowflake" based on his response to the FBI's Russia probe in May 2017.

Shelly Haslam-Ormerod, senior lecturer in mental health and wellbeing at Edge Hill University, strongly criticised the use of the term, arguing in The Conversation that it stigmatises the mental health challenges faced by today's young people in an uncertain world and noting that even children aged under 10 have been unfairly labelled "snowflakes" in tabloid articles. In 2017, a U.S. marketing company created a "snowflake test" to be used in its hiring process to "weed out overly sensitive, liberal candidates who are too easily offended". Many questions were designed to assess a candidate's stance on America, police, and guns. However, psychologist and academic from the Manchester Business School at the University of Manchester, Cary Cooper suggests it is a poor strategy for attracting talented younger workers. "Broflake" (from "bro" and "snowflake") is a related derogatory term which the Oxford Dictionaries define as "a man who is readily upset or offended by progressive attitudes that conflict with his more conventional or conservative views". It has also been applied to women, in the more general sense of someone who claims to not be easily offended, yet often is.

== In popular culture and other languages ==
In March 2017, the American live sketch comedy show Saturday Night Live aired a skit about a Trump-loving dog that, through the aid of technology, was able to berate the anti-Trump humans in the room as "liberal snowflakes". While "generation snowflake" has been calqued into other languages, the phrase "tofu mentality" has been used in Japanese culture, while "heart of glass" has been used in Cantonese to describe the Little Pink generation.

== See also ==
- Cuckservative
- Owning the libs
- Social justice warrior
- Strawberry generation
- Trigger warning
- Woke
