= Slang dictionary =

Reference book

A slang dictionary is a reference book containing an alphabetical list of slang, which is vernacular vocabulary not generally acceptable in formal usage, usually including information given for each word, including meaning, pronunciation, and etymology. It can provide definitions on a range of slang from more mundane terms (like "rain check" or "bob and weave") to obscure sexual practices. Such works also can include words and phrases arising from different dialects and argots, which may or may not have passed into more common usage. They can also track the changing meaning of the terms over time and space, as they migrate and mutate.

== Famous slang dictionaries ==
=== 17th and 18th centuries ===
Slang dictionaries have been around for hundreds of years.

The Canting Academy, or Devil's Cabinet Opened was a 17th-century slang dictionary, written in 1673 by Richard Head, that looked to define thieves' cant.

A New Dictionary of the Terms Ancient and Modern of the Canting Crew, was first published c. 1698.

A Classical Dictionary of the Vulgar Tongue, by Francis Grose was first published in 1785. Grose's work was arguably the most significant English-language slang dictionary until John Camden Hotten's 1859 A Dictionary of Modern Slang, Cant, and Vulgar Words.

=== Modern times ===
In recent years, dictionaries with a more academic focus have tried to bring together etymological studies in an attempt to provide definitive guides to slang while avoiding problems arising from folk etymology and false etymology. The study of slang is now taken seriously by academics, especially lexicographers like the late Eric Partridge, devoting their energies to the field and publishing on it, including producing slang dictionaries.

=== Examples ===
- Green's Dictionary of Slang (by Jonathon Green, Chambers, ISBN 978-0-550-10440-3), 2010 comprising three volumes: A–E; F–O; P–Z
- Chambers Slang Dictionary (by Jonathon Green, Chambers Harrap Publishers, ISBN 978-0-550-10439-7), 2008 previously Cassell Dictionary of Slang (Cassell Reference, 1998; last edition 2006, ISBN 978-0-304-36636-1)
- Dictionary of Slang and Unconventional English (by Eric Partridge and Paul Beale, Routledge, 2002, ISBN 0-415-29189-5)
- The Oxford Dictionary of Modern Slang (by John Ayto and John Simpson, Oxford University Press, 2005, ISBN 0-19-861052-1)

=== Vulgar slang ===
There have also been a subsequent amount of tongue-in-cheek efforts which tend to focus on the more vulgar slang terms:

- Roger's Profanisaurus Rex: The Ultimate Swearing Dictionary (third edition, Viz, 2005, ISBN 0-7522-2812-9)
- Slang Defined (by Aaron Peckham, Andrews McMeel, 2006, ISBN 0-7407-5143-3)
- Urban Dictionary (By Aaron Peckham), 1999

== See also ==
- Jargon
- Thieves' cant
