= Green's Dictionary of Slang =

Multi-volume historical dictionary of English slang

Cover of the first volume of the print edition (2010) of Green's Dictionary of Slang.

Green's Dictionary of Slang (GDoS) is a multivolume dictionary defining and giving the history of English slang from around the Early Modern English period to the present day written by Jonathon Green. As a historical dictionary it covers not only slang words in use in the present day but also those from the past which are no longer used, and illustrates its definitions with quotations. It is thus comparable in method to the Oxford English Dictionary (OED) though with a narrower scope, since it includes only slang words; nonetheless it is more comprehensive within its scope, containing 125,000 items of slang while the OED has only 7,700 terms carrying a slang label.

The dictionary is free to access online at greensdictofslang.com.

== History ==
Jonathon Green, the dictionary's author, considers the work to be in the lineage of English slang dictionaries going back to Francis Grose's 18th-century Classical Dictionary of the Vulgar Tongue and further to the 1566 glossary Caveat for Common Cursetours by Thomas Harman. The dictionary's direct ancestor is Eric Partridge's Dictionary of Slang and Unconventional English (1937–84) which originally inspired Green to write his own dictionary of slang, published as The Dictionary of Contemporary Slang in 1984.

In 1993 Cassell commissioned Green to create a new dictionary, this time broadening the focus to include slang terms from approximately 1500 onwards, but without citations. The first edition of the single-volume Cassell's Dictionary of Slang appeared in 1998. Cassell immediately commissioned a sequel with full historical quotations as in the OED. Green turned down an offer from Routledge to revise Partridge's dictionary in order to embark on his own work of far greater magnitude, helped by the bequest of his deceased uncle which allowed Green to spend much more money on the necessary lexicographical research than his publisher was able to provide.

Work on the dictionary continued throughout the 2000s, with a second edition of Cassell's Dictionary of Slang appearing as an interim work in 2005 and, after the acquisition of Cassell by Chambers, a third edition under the new title of the Chambers Slang Dictionary in 2008.

In 2009 the dictionary was ready to be published in its first edition, and was released in 2010 in Great Britain by Hachette (the new owners of Chambers Harrap) and in 2011 in North America by the Oxford University Press. Though Green hoped to release a full and regularly updated online edition shortly thereafter, due to a legal dispute with the dictionary's new publishers, only a limited release as an Oxford Reference ebook was possible, with no updates made.

However, having found a suitable partner through an appeal posted on the website Language Log, an updated and fully searchable online edition of the dictionary was launched in 2016 as an independent publication.

== Reception ==
Upon release of the first print edition, critical reception was broadly positive. The Guardian, the Financial Times, The Daily Telegraph, the New Statesman, and The New York Times among others praised the dictionary for its breadth and the quality of the research. It received the 2012 Dartmouth Medal of the American Library Association as a reference work of outstanding quality and significance. Michael Quinion of the website World Wide Words wrote of the dictionary's approach that "In its historical approach, GDoS matches the Oxford English Dictionary and it’s not hyperbolic to suggest that it’s the OED of slang."

Academic reviews of the print edition also generally praised the dictionary, though there were some points of criticism. Michael Adams wrote in the journal Dictionaries that, though the dictionary was good overall, there were problems with the clarity and focus of definitions and the accuracy of etymology which he felt left him unable to unequivocally recommend GDoS to the exclusion of previous similar dictionaries (such as the Historical Dictionary of American Slang (HDAS) of Jonathan Lighter) as others had done.

A similar comparison to HDAS was made by Simon Winchester in the New York Review of Books. Unlike Adams, Winchester wrote that GDoS scored strongly against HDAS in almost every regard, but his view was disputed in a response by Geoffrey Nunberg of Language Log, who claimed that Lighter's dictionary was better organized and often had earlier citations which GDoS missed. Green responded to Nunberg pointing out that HDAS often used a hypothetical date of composition of texts in its citations where GDoS consistently uses the more certain, but inevitably later date of first publication instead, and also defending GDoS against some of Nunberg's other claims.

Upon launch of the online edition in 2016, the new version also garnered praise in the International Journal of Lexicography and positive news coverage in publications including Time, Qz.com, and Slate.
