= Christopher B. Donnan =

Archaeologist

Christopher B. Donnan is an archaeologist. He has researched the Moche civilization of ancient Peru for more than fifty years, conducting numerous excavations of Peruvian archaeological sites. Donnan has traveled the world photographing Moche artwork for purposes of publication, recording both museum artifacts and private collections that would otherwise be unavailable to the public. He has published extensively, both academically and for the general public.

When not involved in writing or fieldwork, Donnan taught anthropology at University of California Los Angeles as Professor Emeritus and served as Director for the Fowler Museum. He has since retired.

== Publications ==
- Ancient Burial Patterns of the Moche Valley, Peru. University of Texas Press, 1978.
- Burial Theme in Moche Iconography. Genealogical Publishing Company, 1979.
- Ceramics of Ancient Peru. University of California Los Angeles, 1993.
- Early Ceremonial Architecture in the Andes. Genealogical Publishing Company, 1985.
- Moche Art and Iconography. University of California, 1976.
- Moche Art of Peru: Pre-Columbian Symbolic Communication. University of California Los Angeles, 1999.
- Moche Fineline Painting: Its Evolution and Its Artists. University of California Los Angeles, 1999.
- Moche occupation of the Santa Valley, Peru. University of California, 1973.
- Moche Portraits from Ancient Peru. University of Texas Press, 2003.
- Moche Tombs at Dos Cabezas. Cotsen Institute of Archaeology, 2007.
- The Pacatnamu Papers. University of California Los Angeles, 1986.
