= Kwame Akoto =

Ghanaian artist (born 1950)

Kwame Akoto (born 1950) is a Ghanaian painter and artist. He lives in Kumasi, Ghana.

== Early life and career ==
Akoto was born in Kumasi, where he had his elementary and middle school education. He showed interest in art early on in his life and studied with two art masters, Addaï and Kobia Amafi. In 1972, he opened his first art workshop which he named 'Anthony Art Works,' in dedication to the eleventh-century Franciscan friar Anthony of Padua. He adopted the name 'Almighty God' after he converted to Christianity. He then changed the name of his workshop to Amighty God Art Works. His religious encounter has had significant influence on his life and work, especially the moral stances that appear often in his work. His workshop has produced advertisement materials, including hand-painted film posters, barbershop signs, and salon shop signs. Akoto was included in Ghanaian artist and historian Atta Kwami's book Kumasi Realism.

== Exhibitions ==
Akoto and his work have been featured in many exhibitions across the world, including in Ghana, Italy, Poland, Netherlands, France, Denmark, Portugal, and the United States. In 2022, he was the subject of a retrospective exhibition at The Fowler Museum at UCLA.
