= Historical Dictionary of American Slang =

- Volume 1
- Author: Jonathan E. Lighter
- Language: English
- Subject: Slang
- Genre: Reference work
- Publisher: Random House
- Publication date: 1994 (v.1), 1997 (v.2)
- Publication place: United States
- Media type: Print
- Pages: 1742 (first 2 vols.)
- ISBN: 0-394-54427-7
- OCLC: 30029055
- Dewey Decimal: 427.973
- LC Class: PE 2846 .H57 1994

The Historical Dictionary of American Slang, often abbreviated HDAS, is a dictionary of American slang. The first two volumes, Volume 1, A – G (1994), and Volume 2, H – O (1997), were published by Random House, and the work then was known as the Random House Historical Dictionary of American Slang, sometimes abbreviated as RHHDAS. Both volumes used the same ISBN, ISBN 0-394-54427-7; the paperback editions are ISBN 978-0-394-54427-4 for Volume 1 and ISBN 978-0-679-43464-1 for Volume 2.

== Background ==
When Random House discontinued publication, Oxford University Press announced in 2003 that it would publish the two remaining volumes, Volume 3, P – S [Part 1], ISBN 978-0-19-517418-2, and Volume 4, S [Part 2] – Z. As of 2020, however, those volumes have not yet been published.

Each entry includes representative quotations, including the earliest quotation using the word. HDAS is edited by Jonathan E. Lighter of the University of Tennessee. It is sometimes compared to Green's Dictionary of Slang, which takes a generally similar approach but is not focused specifically on American slang.

The HDAS is not to be confused with the DAS, the Dictionary of American Slang (1975).
