= Urban Dictionary =

Crowdsourced online dictionary of slang terms

- Screenshot Front page in 2018
- Website type: Dictionary
- Available in: English
- Owner: Aaron Peckham
- Creator: Aaron Peckham
- Website: urbandictionary.com
- Launched: December 9, 1999; 26 years ago
- Current status: Active

Urban Dictionary is a crowdsourced English-language online dictionary for slang words and phrases. The website was founded in 1999 by Aaron Peckham. Originally, Urban Dictionary was intended as a dictionary of slang or cultural words and phrases, not typically found in standard English dictionaries, but it is now used to define any word, event, or phrase. Words or phrases on Urban Dictionary may have multiple definitions, usage examples, and tags. As of 2014, the dictionary contains over seven million definitions, while around 2,000 new entries were being added daily.

== History ==
The site was founded in 1999 by Peckham while he was a freshman computer science major at California Polytechnic State University, San Luis Obispo. He launched the site to compare urban slang used by university students in different parts of California. He had previously created a spoof version of the Ask Jeeves web search engine while studying at Cal Poly but closed the website after he received an infringement letter. He created Urban Dictionary initially as a parody of actual dictionaries, which he thought tended to be "stuffy" and "take themselves too seriously".

For the first five years, the site generated revenue but did not make a profit. In 2003, the website gained wider attention after a news article revealed that a judge of the High Court of Justice in the United Kingdom had used Urban Dictionary to assist interpreting slang lyrics in a case involving two rappers.

By 2009, the site had listed around 4 million entries and received about 2,000 new submissions per day. In April 2009, the site registered 15 million unique visitors, while 80 percent of its monthly users were younger than 25. In July 2009, Peckham explained to The New York Times that Urban Dictionary is not Wikipedia, because it doesn't attempt neutrality: "Every single word on here [Urban Dictionary] is written by someone with a point of view, with a personal experience of the word in the entry."

The website was later referenced in a 2011 District Court complaint by Bureau of Alcohol, Tobacco, Firearms and Explosives (ATF) agents to document the meaning of the vulgarism "murk", as used in a criminal threat.

Over a 30-day period in March and April 2011, 67,000 people wrote 76,000 new definitions for Urban Dictionary, while 3,500 volunteer editors were registered. In an April 2011 article in The Guardian titled "In praise of urban dictionaries", Peckham revealed an overview of 10 rules that he had devised for the site's content: "Publish celebrity names, but reject 'real life' names. Reject nonsense, inside jokes or anything submitted in capital letters. Racial and sexual slurs are allowed, racist and sexist entries are not."

At the start of 2014, 32-year-old Peckham resided in San Francisco, U.S., and, while he did not reveal exact figures, he informed the media that the site was "stable and growing", and generated enough profit for both him and the site's maintenance. Peckham continued as the site's sole employee and maintained that he was not interested in venture funding or an initial public offering (IPO): "It is weird to be in Silicon Valley and want to be independent and not be on track to IPO or want an acquisition ... But I think something special would be sacrificed if that were to happen."

As of January 5, 2014, 50% of the site's traffic was mobile and the iPhone app had been downloaded nearly three million times. Although English entries were by far the most common prior to the multilingual transition, some words from languages that have been incorporated or assimilated into English-speaking societies were published, including those from Swahili, Arabic, and the Fula languages.

== Content ==
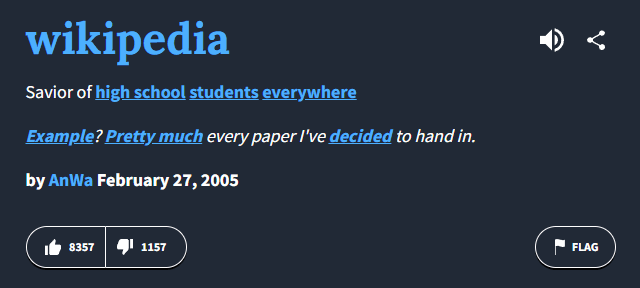
Definition of "Wikipedia" on Urban Dictionary

In the context of Urban Dictionary, "definitions" include not only literal definitions, but also descriptions. As such, "to define" a word or phrase on Urban Dictionary does not necessarily entail providing a strict definition; merely a description of some aspect of the word or phrase could suffice for inclusion in the dictionary.

Originally, Urban Dictionary was intended as a dictionary of slang, or cultural words or phrases, not typically found in standard dictionaries, but it is now used to define any word or phrase. Words or phrases on Urban Dictionary may have multiple definitions, usage examples, and tags.

Visitors to Urban Dictionary may submit definitions without registering, but they must provide a valid email address.

=== Quality control ===
By default, each definition is accepted or rejected based on the number of "Publish" or "Don't Publish" votes it receives from volunteer editors. The editors are not bound by any criteria for the approval or rejection of definitions. Editors previously needed a valid email address, but it is no longer required. Three options are provided for new words: "Add It!," "Keep Out!," and "I Can't Decide." However, a Facebook or Gmail account is required to post a new definition. Editors are not allowed to edit entries for spelling, wording or punctuation.

=== Issues with content ===
Urban Dictionary has been criticized for hosting and failing to remove offensive submissions, including ones containing racist and sexist content. For example, the abundance of racist definitions of "aboriginal" prompted a petition calling for their removal on Change.org which received over 7,000 signatures.

Urban Dictionary's guidelines list "hate speech, bullying, or any other statements meant to discriminate or incite violence against others" as a reportable offense.

== Usage ==
At the start of 2014, the dictionary had over seven million definitions, while 2,000 new entries were being added daily.

In November 2014, the Advertise page of the website stated that, on a monthly basis, Urban Dictionary averages 72 million impressions and 18 million unique readers. According to Peckham in January 2014, just under 40% of the site's traffic is international, while the site's audience was predominantly male and aged between 15 and 24.

By July 2020, the dictionary had over 12 million definitions.

== Application ==
=== Legal cases ===
As of 2013, Urban Dictionary has been used in several court cases to define slang terms not found in standard dictionaries. For example, the slang term "jack" was used to define the name the defendant used for his team, "the jack boys." Urban Dictionary was also used in a District Court complaint where a man posted a threat on a gun exchange Facebook page to "murk that cocksucker". The crowd-sourced dictionary was also used in a sexual harassment court case in Tennessee to define the phrase "to nut" as "to ejaculate".

=== Other ===
In Canada and the United States, some state Departments of Motor Vehicles refer to Urban Dictionary in determining if certain license plates are appropriate or not. For example, a man in Las Vegas was allowed to keep "HOE" as his license plate after managing to convince the state, with the use of Urban Dictionary, that it meant "TAHOE", as in the vehicle made by Chevrolet, since that was already taken.

IBM had programmed Watson to use Urban Dictionary. After having all the words and definitions incorporated into Watson, it began responding to researchers' questions with profanity, leading the programmers to remove it from its memory and adding another filter to prevent it from swearing in the future.

In August 2019, the Malacañang Palace reacted to definitions of Philippine President Rodrigo Duterte's last name on the site; defining 'duterte' as "deceptive, sly, fake" and, "that leftover shit that you wipe off your anus after pooping." Presidential spokesperson Salvador Panelo said the definitions of Duterte are "exact opposites" of the traits of President Duterte, and that Duterte to them means "honest, incorruptible, politically-willed person, courageous, selfless, honest, transparent and all good things... and other synonymous terms." The spokesperson also admitted he had never heard of the site before, and believed that anti-Duterte groups were behind the definitions.

Linguists continue to use Urban Dictionary for charting the development of slang terms, particularly those from the early 2000s before the advent of many social media platforms.
