= Berg Encyclopedia of World Dress and Fashion =

- Editor: Joanne Eicher
- Language: English
- Subject: Clothing, fashion
- Published: 2010
- Publisher: Berg Publishers
- Media type: 10 volumes
- Awards: Dartmouth Medal (2011)
- ISBN: 978-1-84788-104-5
- OCLC: 276221868
- Dewey Decimal: 391.003
- LC Class: GT507 .E54 2010

The Berg Encyclopedia of World Dress and Fashion is an encyclopedia about dress and ornamentation of the body in different cultures throughout history. It explores themes of personal and social identity related to the universal activity of dressing one's self. Its ten volumes are dedicated to describing and interpreting dress and fashion in different places throughout the world, and are organized geographically. The last volume reviews the global perspectives through research and study of the present-day and the future of dress and fashion. Joanne Eicher was the encyclopedia's editor-in-chief for all of its ten volumes.

== Description ==
Composed of 760 articles, and written by more than 600 international experts, it includes multidisciplinary and pluricultural perspectives that allow us to understand the richness and complexity of dress in all of its manifestations. The definitions of dress, apparel, and fashion are the starting point and the principal focus of the various contributions: dress is analyzed as a body modification, apparel is connected to history or the exhibition in a museum, and fashion corresponds to the changes related to body alterations and ornamentation, over short periods of time.

== Prizes and awards ==
The Berg Encyclopedia of World Dress and Fashion was awarded with the Dartmouth Medal for a reference work of outstanding quality and significance, in 2011. This was the first time that award was given to a work in the design sector. The Dartmouth Medal is awarded to reference works (dictionaries, encyclopedias, image banks, etc.) by the American Library Association.

The encyclopedia has also been the recipient of an award at the Frankfurt Book Fair in 2011 and the Best Web 2011 prize by FutureBook bookstore.
