= Historical Statistics of the United States =

- 1960 edition
- Language: English
- Genre: Reference
- Publisher: Cambridge University Press
- Publication date: 2006
- Publication place: United States
- Media type: Print (hardback) and online
- ISBN: 0-521-81791-9 (print), ISBN 0-511-13297-2 (online); ISBN 0-511-13311-1 (bundle)
- OCLC: 222194939
- Dewey Decimal: 317.3 22
- LC Class: HA202 .H57 2006

Historical Statistics of the United States (HSUS) is a compendium of statistics about United States. Published by the United States Census Bureau until 1975, it is now published by Cambridge University Press.

The last free version, the Bicentennial Edition, appeared in two volumes in 1975 and is now available online.

The current commercial version deals with Population, Work and Welfare, Economic Structure and Performance, Economic Sectors and Governance & International Relations, respectively, in five volumes.

The fully searchable and downloadable electronic edition was developed by Data Software Research Company (DSRC) for Cambridge University Press.
