= Joanne Eicher =

American academic and author (1930–2026)

Joanne Bubolz Eicher (September 18, 1930 – June 2026) was an American academic and author who was at one point the leading scholar on Kalabari textiles.

== Early life and education ==
Joanne Bubolz Eicher was born in East Lansing, Michigan on September 18, 1930. In 1952 Eicher received an MS in sociology and anthropology, and in 1959 she received a PhD in sociology and anthropology, all from Michigan State University. She had previously received a BA from Michigan State University in 1948, having majored in languages and literature and minored in textiles and clothing.

== Career ==
Eicher was part of the faculty of Michigan State University's Department of Human and Environmental Design beginning in the late 1960s and continuing until 1977. That year she became head of the Department of Textiles and Clothing at the University of Minnesota; she held that position until 1983. From 1983 until the end of 1987 she was the Department of Design, Housing, and Apparel's head, also at the University of Minnesota. She taught at that university until her retirement in 2005, and in 1995 she was given a Regents’ Professorship there. She eventually became regents professor emerita.

She was also director of the Goldstein Museum of Design from 1983 to 1987.

Eicher was a speaker as part of the Margaret Ritchie Distinguished Speaker series at the University of Idaho in 2003.

She was a member of the Textile Research Centre's Advisory Council beginning in 2006. She was also on the board of the Textile Society of America from 2008 to 2012.

Eicher was the editor-in-chief of the Berg Encyclopedia of World Dress and Fashion, first published in print in 2010.

== Death ==
Eicher died in June 2026, at the age of 95.

== Selected bibliography as author ==
- Johnson, K.K.P., Torntore, S.J. and Eicher, J.B., (2003). Fashion Foundations: Early Writings on Dress. Oxford, UK, Berg Publishers.
- Eicher, J.B. and Ling, Lisa, (2005). Mother, Daughter, Sister, Bride: Rituals of Womanhood, Washington, D. C. National Geographic Society.
- Eicher, J.B. and Evenson, S.L, (2014). The Visible Self: Global Perspectives on Dress, Culture and Society, 4th ed. New York: Fairchild Publishers.
- Eicher, J.B. (2022). Global Trade and Cultural Authentication: The Kalabari of the Niger Delta. Bloomington, Indiana: Indiana University Press.
- Eicher, J.B. and Evenson, S.L, (2023). The Visible Self: Global Perspectives on Dress, Culture and Society, 5th ed. New York: Fairchild Publishers.

== Selected bibliography as editor ==
- Roach-Higgins, M.E., Eicher, J.B., & Johnson, K.P. (Eds.) (1995). Dress and identity. New York: Fairchild Books.
- Eicher, J.B. (Ed.) (1995). Dress and Ethnicity: Chance Across Space & Time, Berg Publishers.
- Sciama, L., Eicher, J.B. (Eds.). (1998) Beads and Beadmakers: Gender, Material Culture, and Meaning. Oxford/New York. Berg Publishers.
- Eicher, J. B. and Ross, Doran, (Eds.) (2010). Volume 1, Africa, Berg Encyclopedia of World Dress and Fashion. New York: Oxford University Press.
- Eicher, J.B. Editor-in-Chief, (2010). Berg Encyclopedia of World Dress and Fashion (10 vols). New York: Oxford University Press.
- Luvaas, B. and Eicher, J.B. (Eds.) (2019). The Anthropology of Dress and Fashion: A Reader, London and New York: Bloomsbury.
- Eicher, J.B. (Ed.) (2022). Global Trade and Cultural Authentication: The Kalabari of the Niger Delta, Bloomington, IN: Indiana University Press.

== Selected awards and honors ==
- 1989: Fellow, International Textile and Apparel Association
- 2003: Honorary Doctorate (Doctor of Humane Letters), Iowa State University
- 2004: Leadership Award, Arts Council of African Studies Association
- 2007: Ada Comstock Distinguished Woman's Faculty Award/Lecturer, University of Minnesota
- 2009: Fellow, Costume Society of America
- 2012: Distinguished Alumni Award, College of Social Science, Michigan State University

== Papers ==
The Joanne B. Eicher papers are at the University of Minnesota Archives, under Collection Identifier ua2005-0028.
