= International Dictionary of Black Composers =

The International Dictionary of Black Composers is a two-volume reference work with biographies and work information for 185 black music composers from across two centuries.

The Dictionary was a project of the Center for Black Music at Columbia College Chicago.
