= Benjamin Wolman =

Polish-American psychologist and writer

Benjamin Binem Wolman (October 27, 1908 – January 3, 2000) was a Polish-American psychologist and writer.

Wolman obtained a Ph.D. in psychology in 1935 from the University of Warsaw. He later emigrated to the United States. He worked as a lecturer at Columbia University and a Professor of Psychology at Yeshiva University. From 1958–1962 he worked as a clinical lecturer in psychiatry at Albert Einstein College of Medicine. From 1965-1978 he worked as Professor of Psychology at Long Island University.

He founded the ″International Organization for the Study of Group Tensions″ and the International Journal of Group Tensions.

Wolman was the editor or writer of 42 books in psychology and over 200 scientific papers, he was a practitioner of psychoanalysis and psychotherapy.

== Selected publications ==
- Handbook of Clinical Psychology (1965)
- Psychosomatic Disorders (1968)
- Children Without Childhood: A Study of Childhood Schizophrenia (1970)
- Manual of Child Psychopathology (1971)
- Handbook of Dreams: Research, Theories, and Applications (1973)
- Handbook of General Psychology (1973)
- Handbook of Parapsychology (1977)
- Logic of Science in Psychoanalysis (1984)
- Handbook of Intelligence: Theories, Measurements, and Applications (1985)
- Handbook of States of Consciousness (1986)
- The Family Guide to Mental Health (1991)
- Personality Dynamics (1992)
- Handbook of Human Sexuality (1993)
- Anxiety and Related Disorders: A Handbook (1994)
- Adolescence: Biological and Psychosocial Perspectives (1998)
