= Fowler Museum at UCLA =

American art museum in California

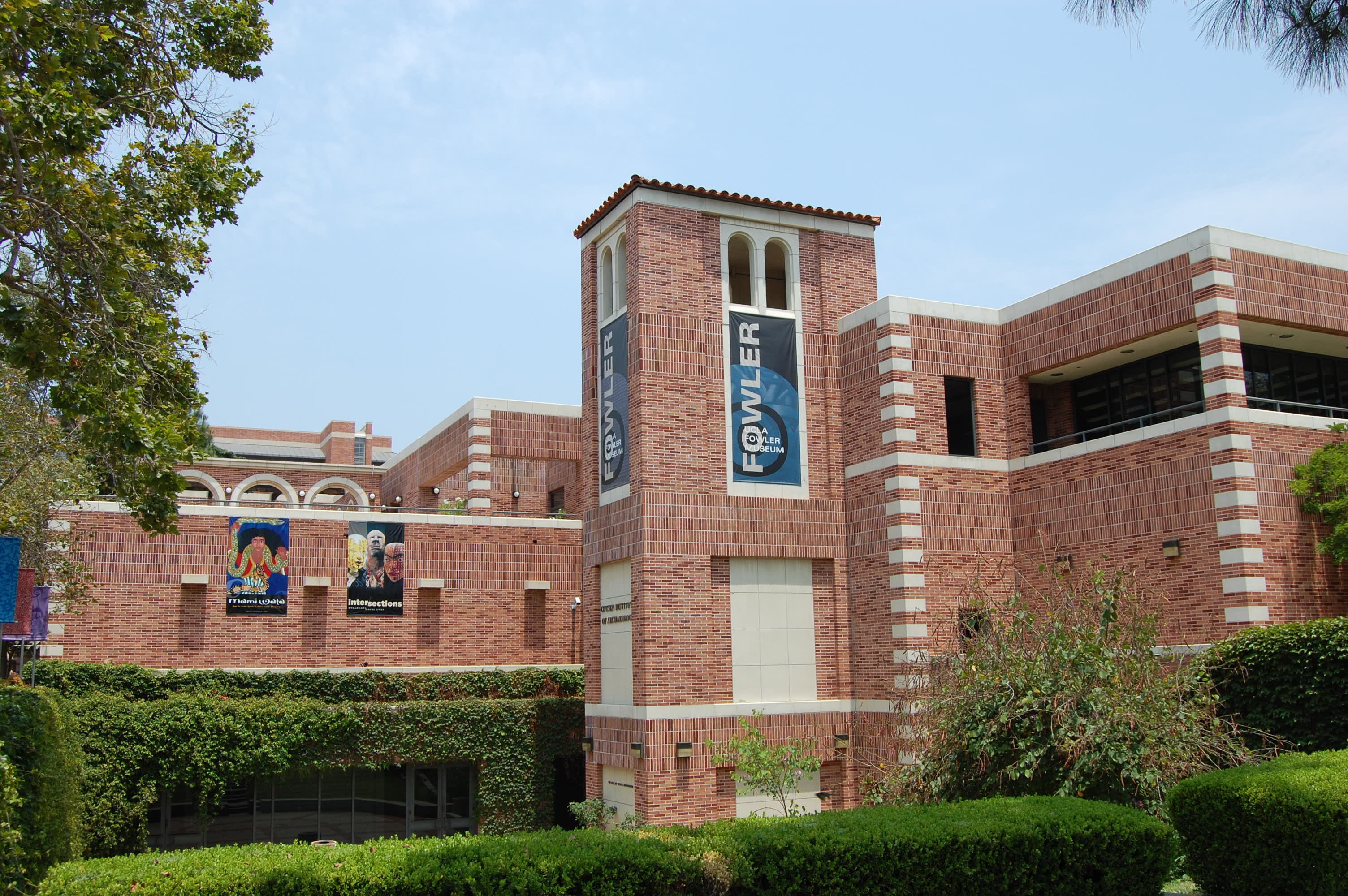

- Location of The Fowler in Los Angeles
- Established: 1963
- Location: 308 Charles E. Young Drive; Los Angeles, CA 90024; United States
- Coordinates: 34.0728°N 118.4431°W
- Type: Art museum, University of California, Los Angeles (UCLA)
- Director: Silvia Forni
- Website: fowler.ucla.edu

The Fowler Museum at UCLA (commonly known as The Fowler, formerly the Museum of Cultural History and Fowler Museum of Cultural History) is a museum on the campus of the University of California, Los Angeles (UCLA) which explores art and material culture primarily from Africa, Asia, the Pacific, and the Americas, past and present.

The Fowler is home to two permanent exhibitions. Four other galleries at the museum host temporary art exhibitions, often simultaneously. The space also serves as a venue for lectures, musical performances, art workshops, family programs, festivals, and more. The Fowler is located in the northern part of UCLA's Westwood Campus, adjacent to Royce Hall and Glorya Kaufman Hall. The Fowler Museum is also home to the UCLA Cotsen Institute of Archaeology, housed in the bottom floor.

The museum is operated under the jurisdiction of UCLA School of the Arts and Architecture.

== History ==
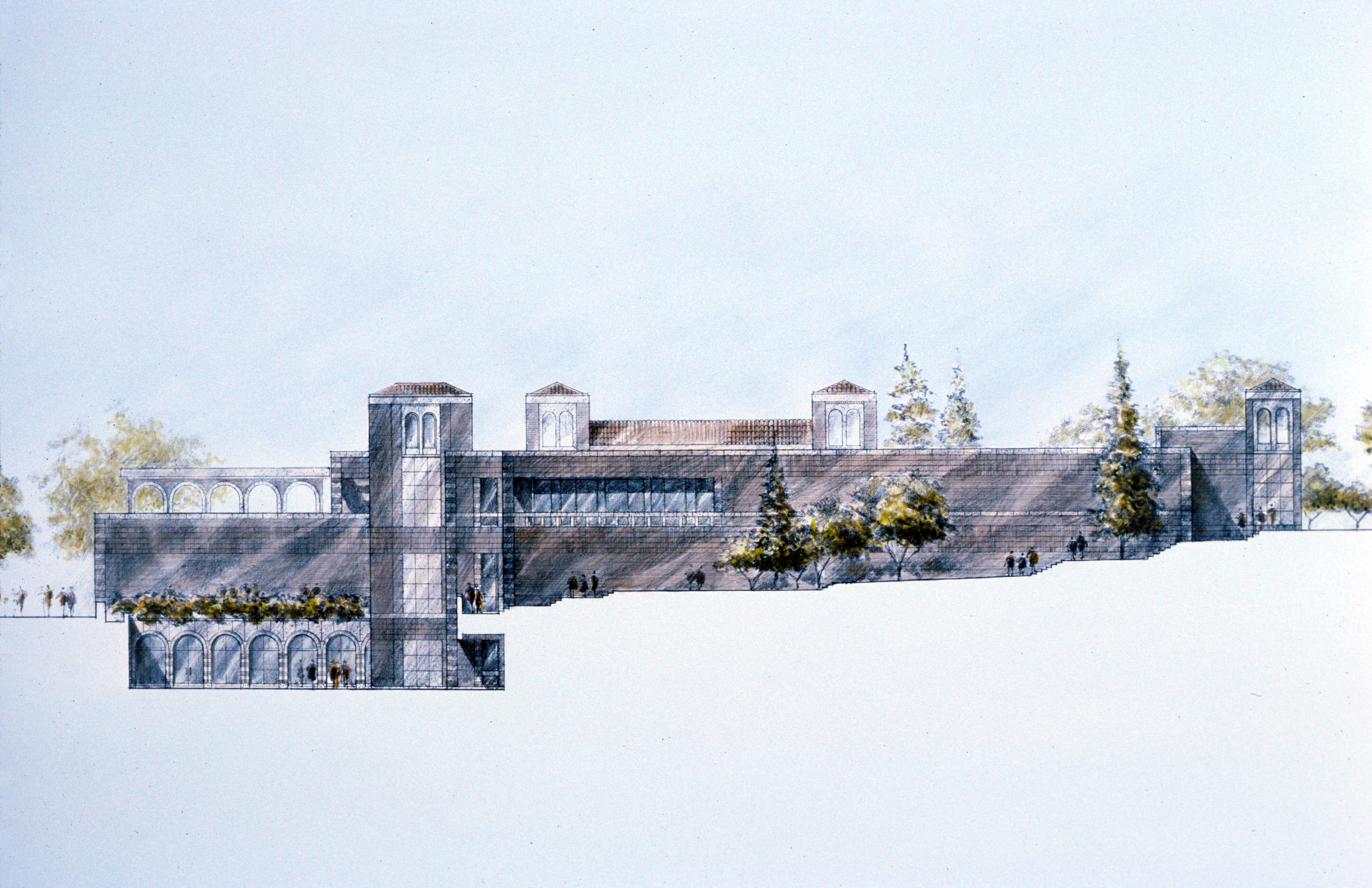
Fowler Museum plan by Savrann

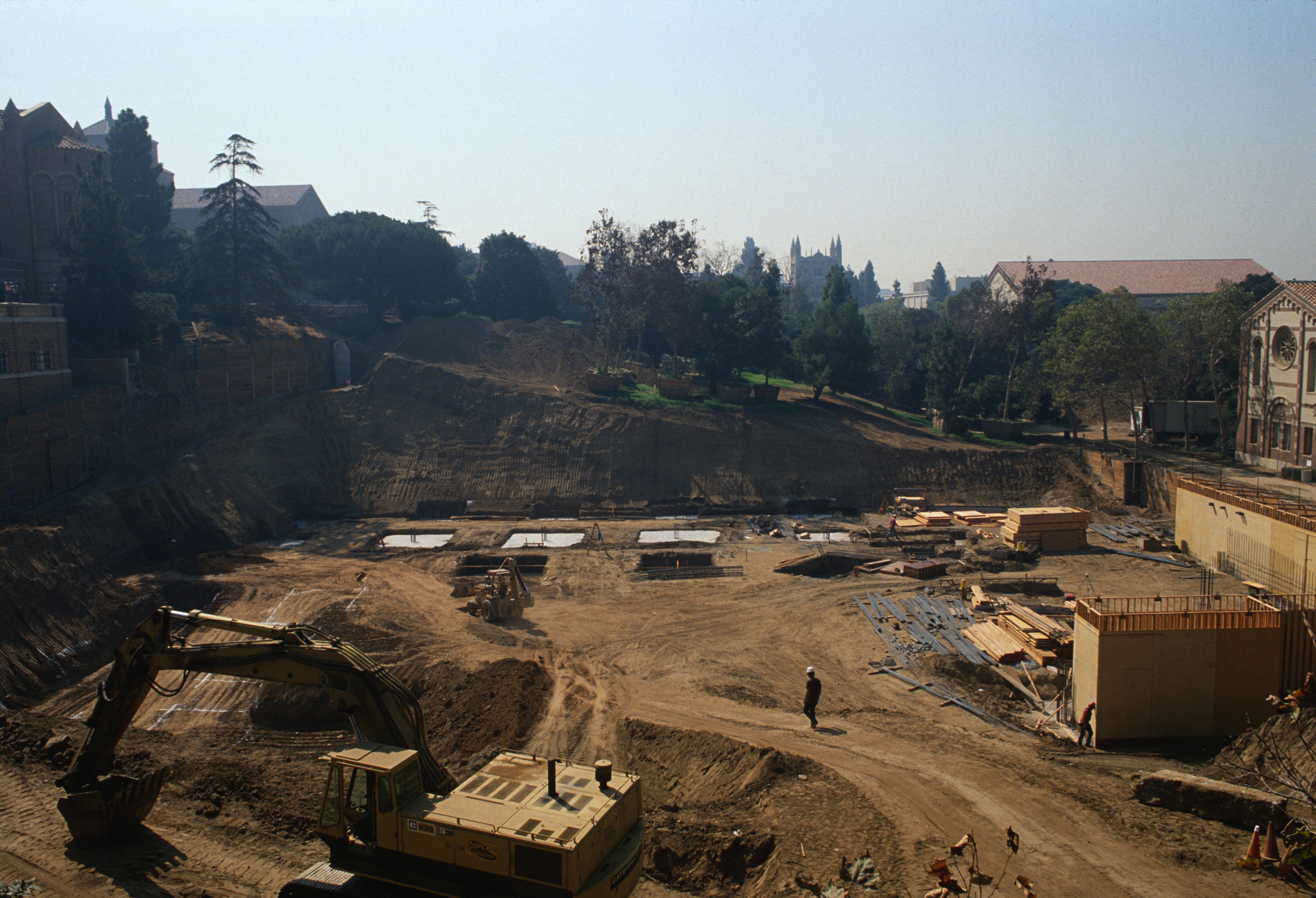
Fowler Museum under construction

The museum was established in 1963 by then UCLA Chancellor Franklin D. Murphy as the Museum and Laboratories of Ethnic Arts and Technology. Its first home was in the basement of Haines Hall on the UCLA campus. The goal of this new museum was to consolidate the various collections of non-Western art and artifacts on campus. In addition to active collecting, the museum initiated research projects, fieldwork, exhibitions and publications.

In 1971, the name was changed to the Museum of Cultural History and by 1975, its collections, in numbers and in quality, ranked it among the top four university museums in the country, a stature it retains to the present day.

In 1981, UCLA Chancellor Charles E. Young, along with museum director, Christopher B. Donnan, developed a plan for a new building to better exhibit the collection. The $22-million structure, designed by architects Arnold C. Savrann and John Carl Warnecke, was funded by both private gifts and state resources. Upon completion of the complex, the museum was renamed to The Fowler Museum of Cultural History, which opened on September 30, 1992, named in recognition of lead support by the Fowler Foundation and the family of collector and inventor Francis E. Fowler Jr., former owner of Southern Comfort. In 1996, Doran H. Ross became the director of the Fowler. In 2006, the name of the museum was formally changed to the Fowler Museum at UCLA.

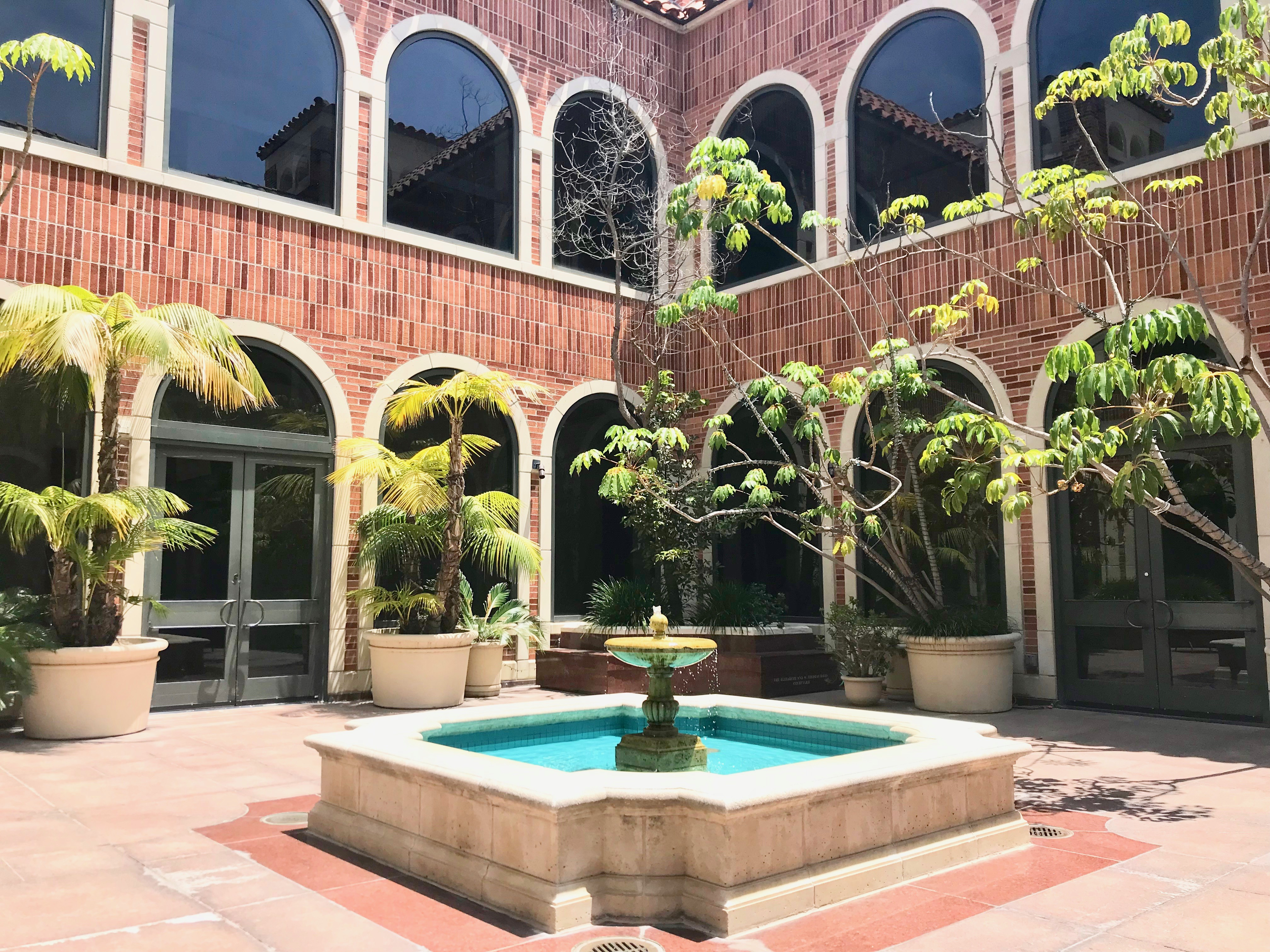
The Fowler's inner courtyard.

In 2024, the museum returned to the Republic of Ghana seven royal artifacts from the Ashanti Empire that had been previously acquired through looting by imperial British forces in the 19th century. These included an elephant tail whisk, an ornamental chair made of wood, leather and iron, two gold stool ornaments, a gold necklace and two bracelets. The artifacts were returned on the 150th anniversary of the capture of Kumasi (1874). That same year, The British Museum and The Victoria and Albert Museum had agreed to lend a number of gold and silver artifacts from their collections that had previously been acquired through looting by the British Empire for a six-year period to the country. The Fowler, however, imposed no conditions regarding the stewardship of the objects and returned full ownership to the country. Likewise in 2024, the museum repatriated 20 objects to the Waramungu community in Australia. In 2026, the museum repatriated a total of 766 cultural items in their collection to the Yuhaaviatam of San Manuel Nation.

== Collections ==
The Fowler's collections comprise more than 120,000 art and ethnographic and 600,000 archaeological objects representing ancient, traditional, and contemporary cultures of Africa, Native and Latin America, and Asia and the Pacific.

The majority of the Fowler's holdings have been acquired via donations by individuals. The Sir Henry Wellcome Collection of 30,000 objects, assembled early in the 20th century by Sir Henry Wellcome and given to the museum in 1965, forms the core of its African and Pacific holdings and represents the single largest gift. This was part of the dispersal of Wellcome's collection, which included over 120,000 objects given on long term loan to the Science Museum in London, now stored at the Science and Innovation Park. More than 15,000 textiles trace the history of cloth over two millennia and across five continents.

Objects from the Fowler Family Silver Collection include 400 works representing 16th- through 19th-century Europe and the United States. Among these are vessels from the workshops of Paul de Lamerie, Karl Fabergé, and Paul Revere. In 1969, Hollywood actress Natalie Wood donated a collection of ancient Chupícuaro Mexican ceramics to the Fowler Museum. In 2013, the Fowler Museum received several gifts in honor of its fiftieth anniversary. One gift was estimated to be worth around $14 million, from collector and Silicon Valley pioneer Jay Last and his wife, Deborah. As reported by the Los Angeles Times, the gift consisted of 92 wood and ivory objects from the Lega people of the Democratic Republic of Congo.

Most of the holdings have been collected in the field and systematically documented, providing contextual information. As the museum augments its programming to meet the interests of the city's growing Latin American population, collection activities in this area have increased. A collection of more than 900 Mexican works was donated in 1997 by the Daniel Family and includes ceramic Trees of Life, Day of the Dead figurines, and masks from Metepec, Oaxaca, Michoacan, Jalisco, Puebla, and Guanajuato.

== Exhibitions ==
=== Permanent Exhibitions ===
The Fowler hosts two permanent exhibitions.

- Intersections: World Arts, Local Lives
- Reflecting Culture: The Francis E. Fowler, Jr. Collection of Silver

=== Past and Present Exhibitions ===
- Mountain Spirits: Rice and Indigeneity in the Northern Luzon Highlands, Philippines, 2026
- Ex-Change, 2025
- Construction, Occupation
- Fire Kinship: Southern California Native Ecology and Art, 2025
- Sangre de Nopal: Tanya Aguiñiga and Porfirio Gutiérrez in Conversation, 2024
- Taming the Desert: Resilience, Religion, and Ancestors in Ancient Peru
- I Will Meet You Yet Again: Contemporary Sikh Art
- The House Was Too Small: Yoruba Sacred Arts from Africa and Beyond, 2023
- How to Make the Universe Right: The Art of Priests and Shamans from Vietnam and Southern China, 2017/2018
- African-Print Fashion Now: A Story of Taste, History, and Style, 2017
- Round Trip: Bicycling Asia Minor, 2014
- Sinful Saints and Saintly Sinners at the Margins of the Americas, 2014
- Continental Rifts: Contemporary Time-based Works of Africa, 2009

== Selected collection highlights ==
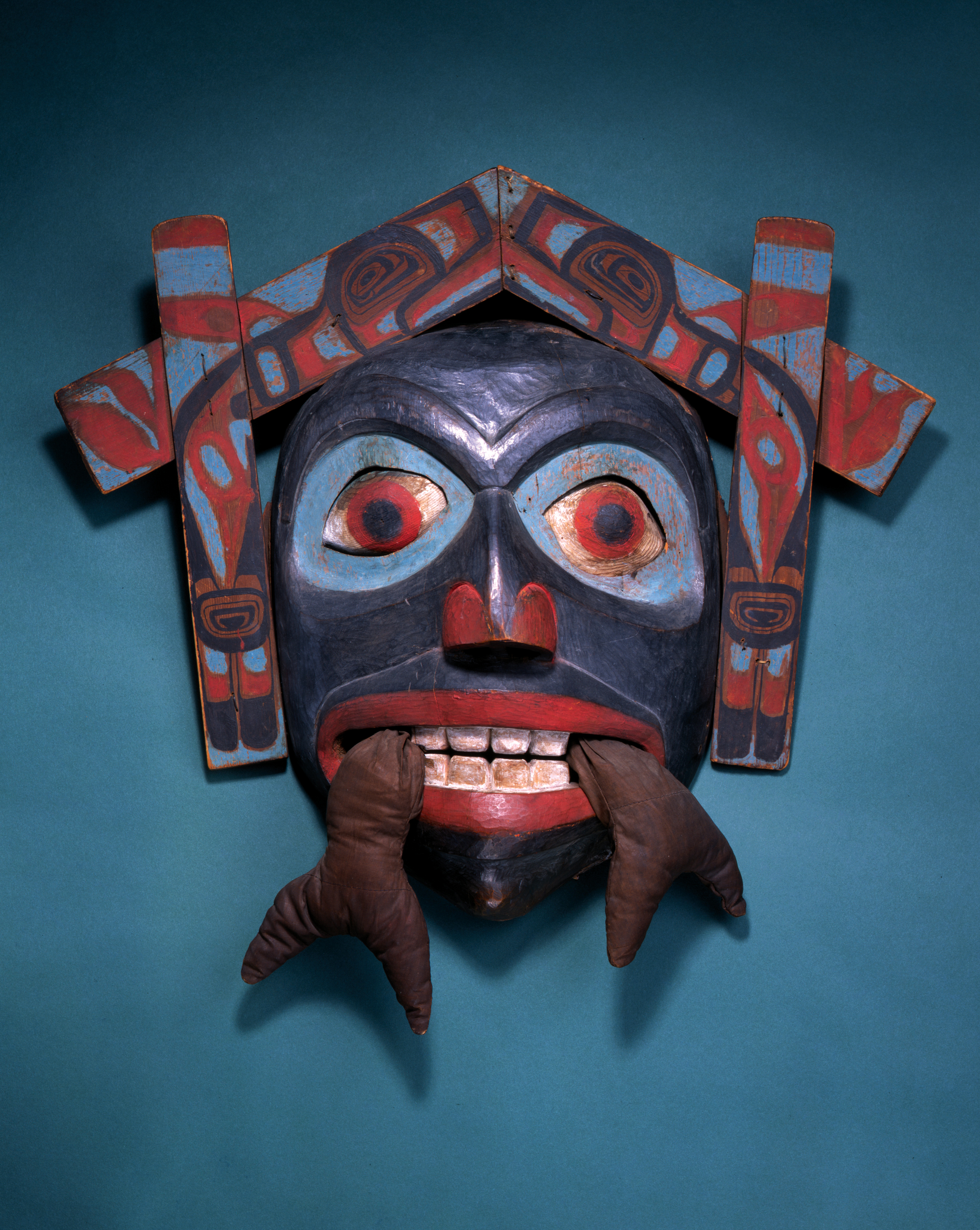
Chief's Mask, Haida people, British Columbia, 19th century,

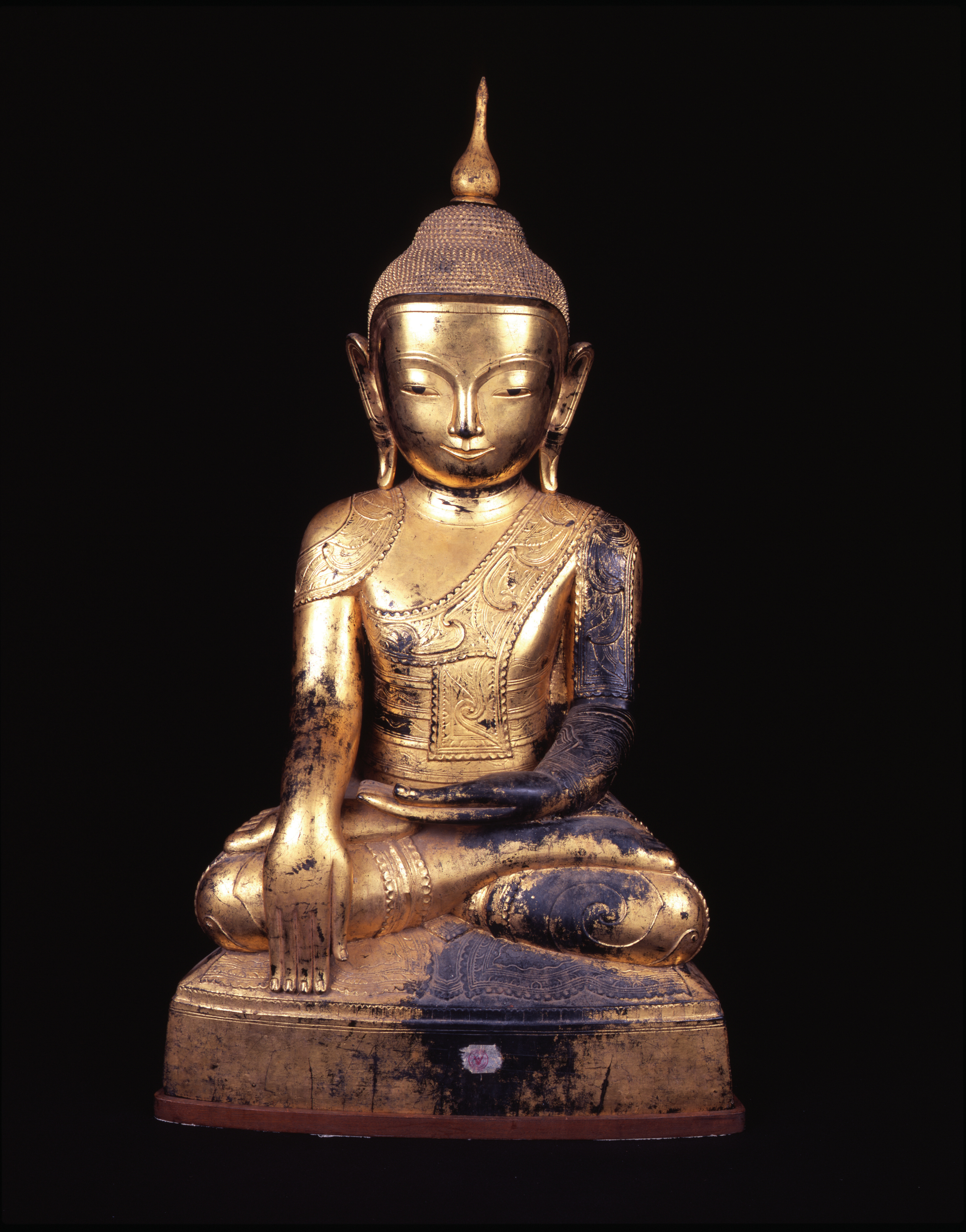
Buddha, Sagaing, Burma, 17th century

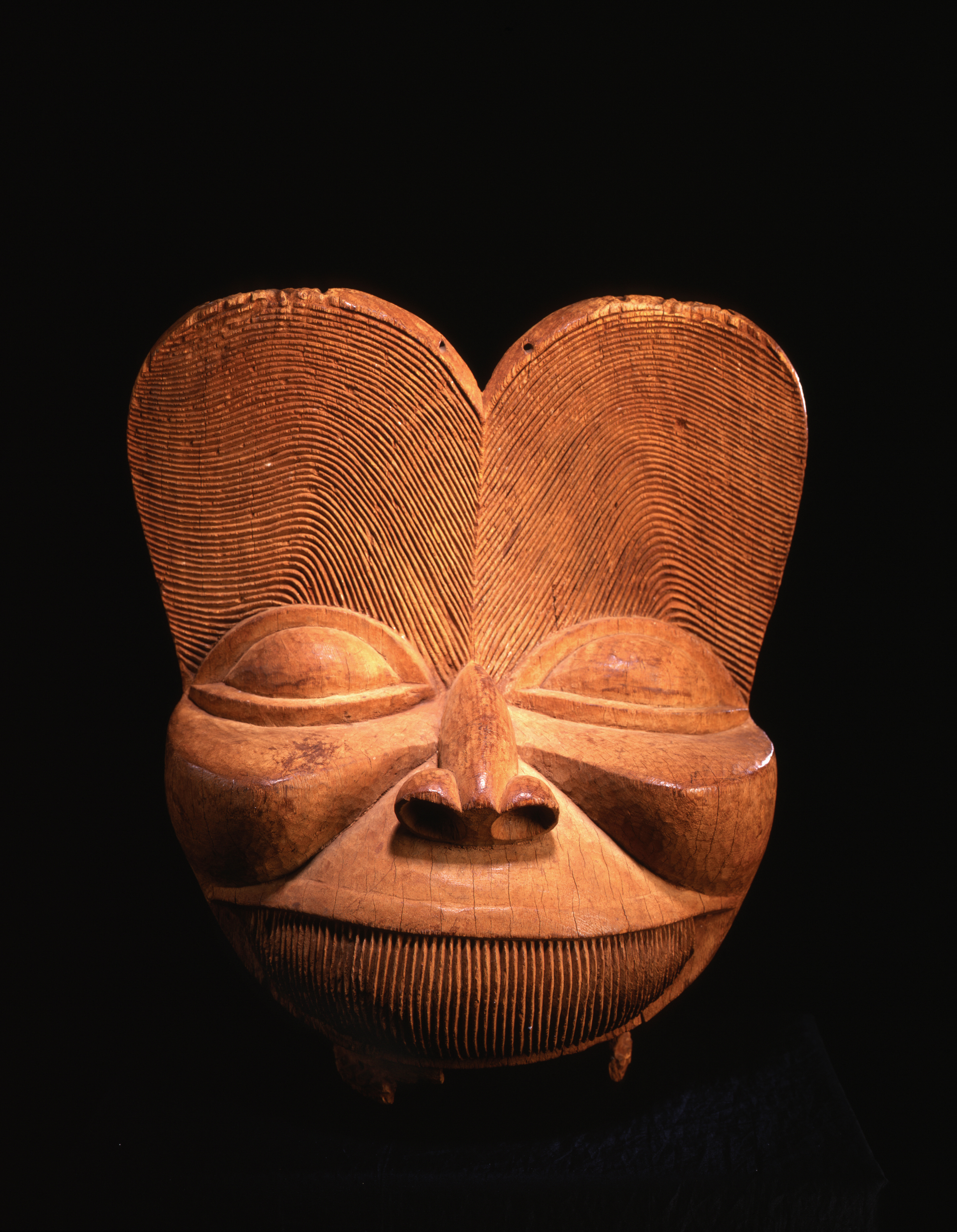
Mask (tsesah), Bamileke people, Bamendjo, Cameroon, Late 19th century

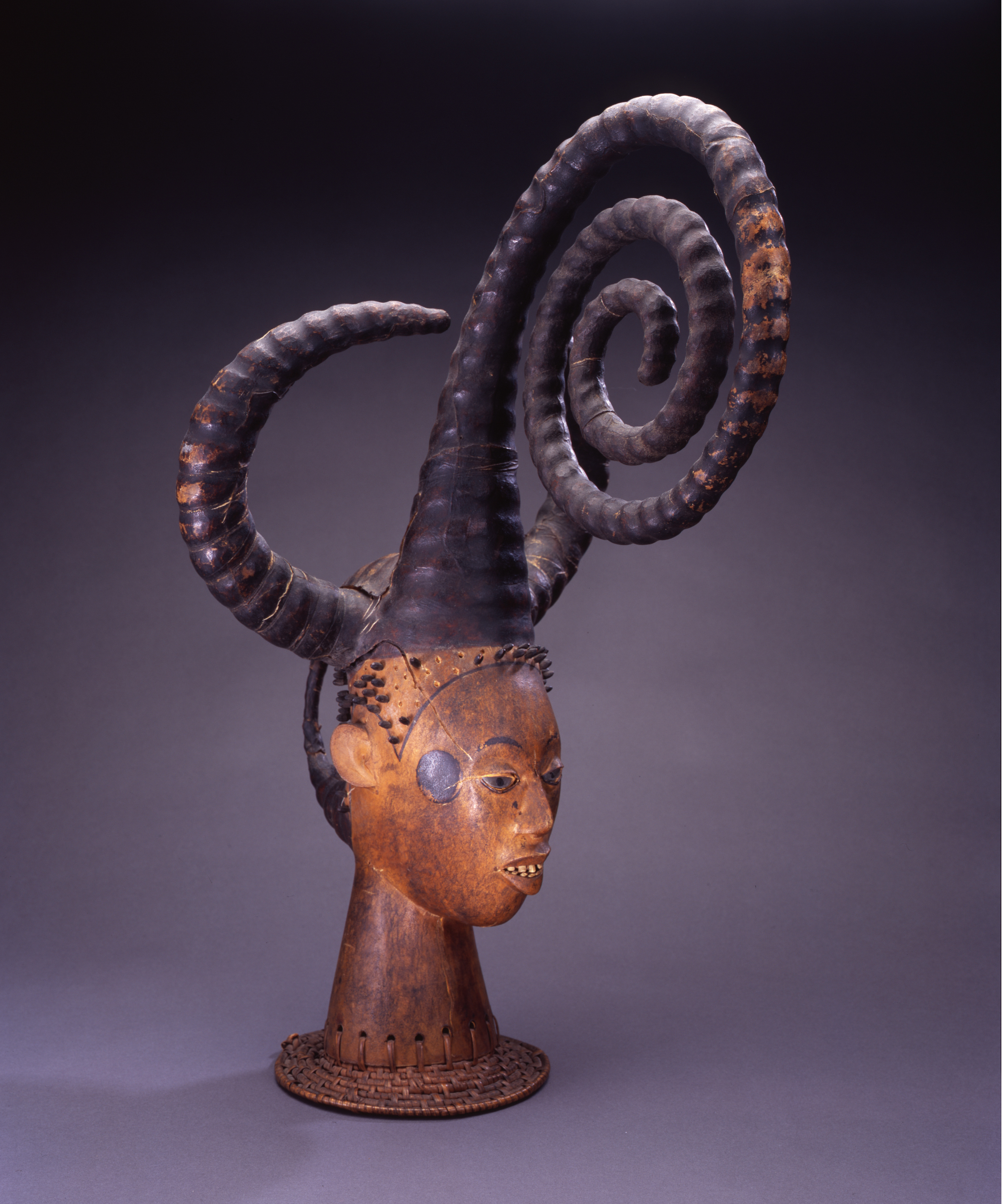
Headdress, Efut peoples, Calabar, Nigeria, 19th century

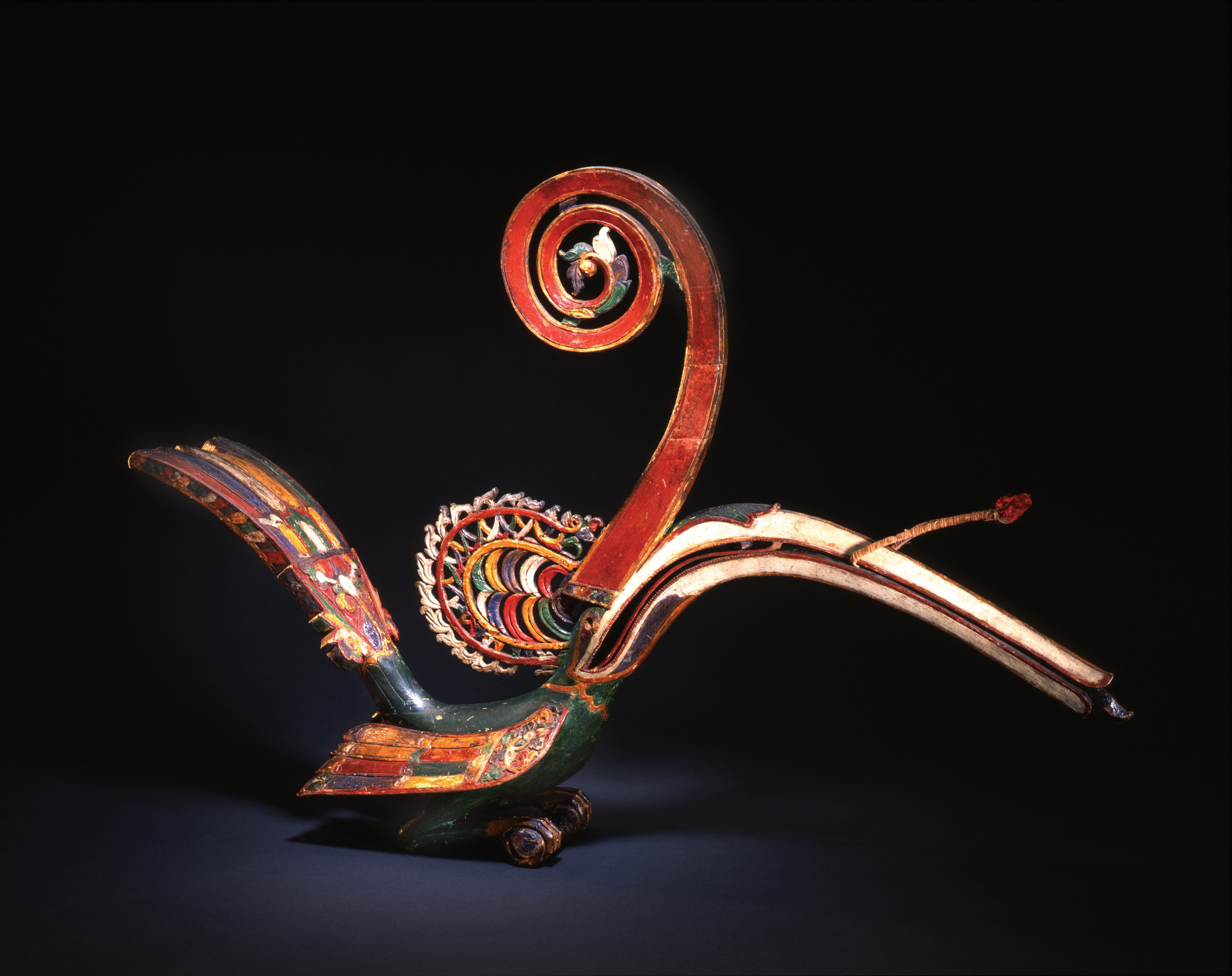
Hornbill figure, Iban, Borneo, 19th century

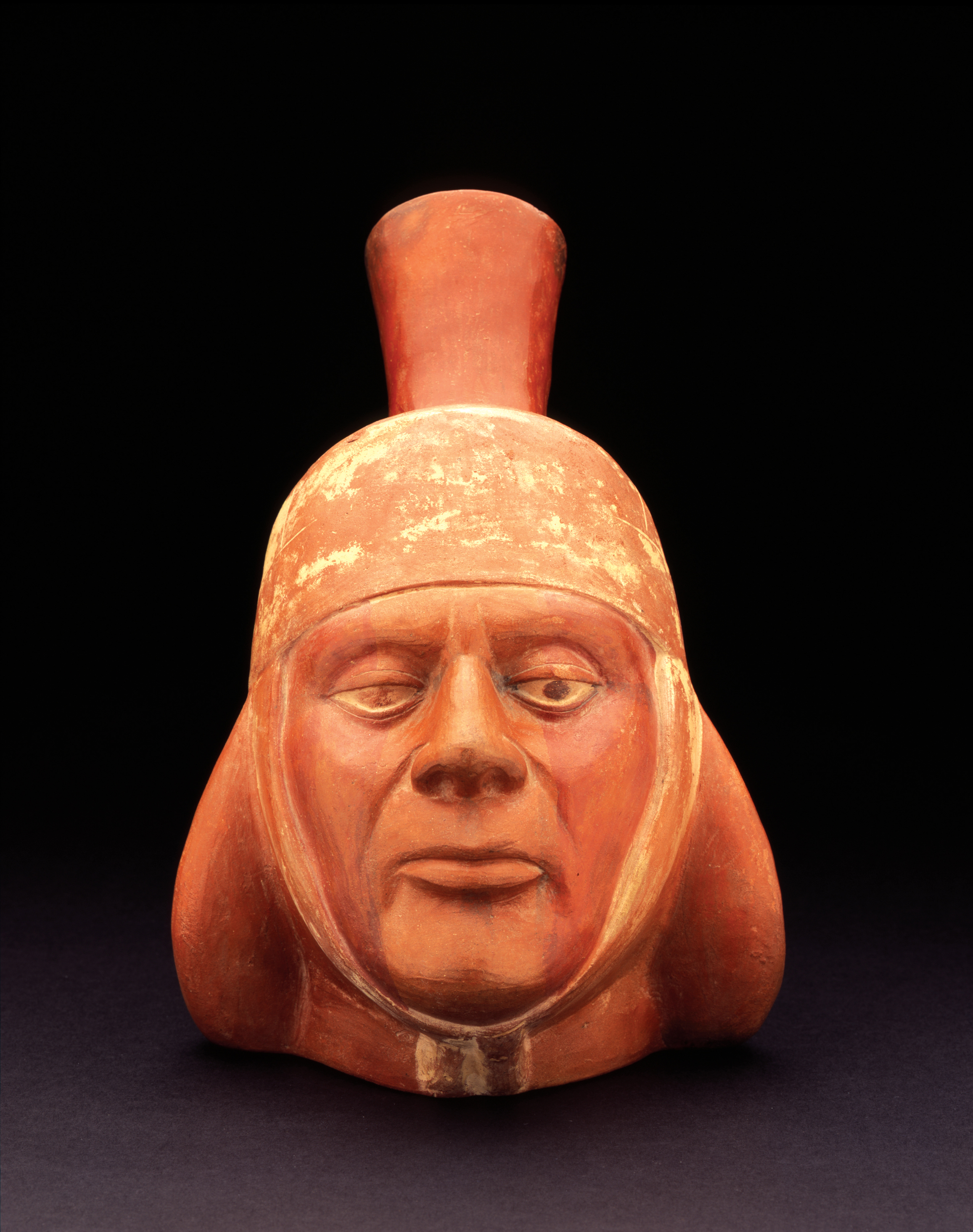
Portrait vessel, Moche style, north coast Peru,100–800 C.E.

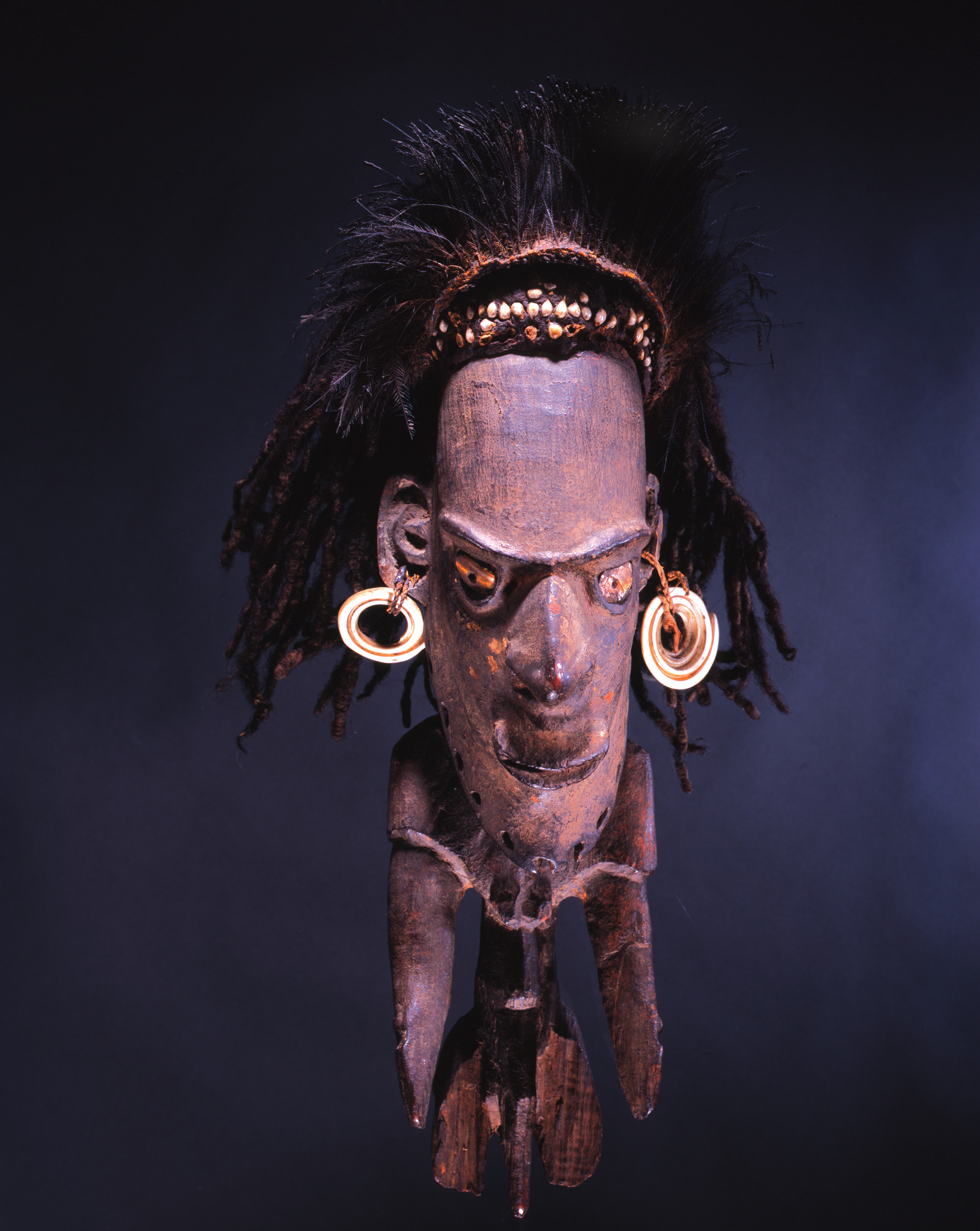
Ornament for a sacred flute, Mundugumor people, Yuat River, East Sepik Province, Papua New Guinea, 19th century

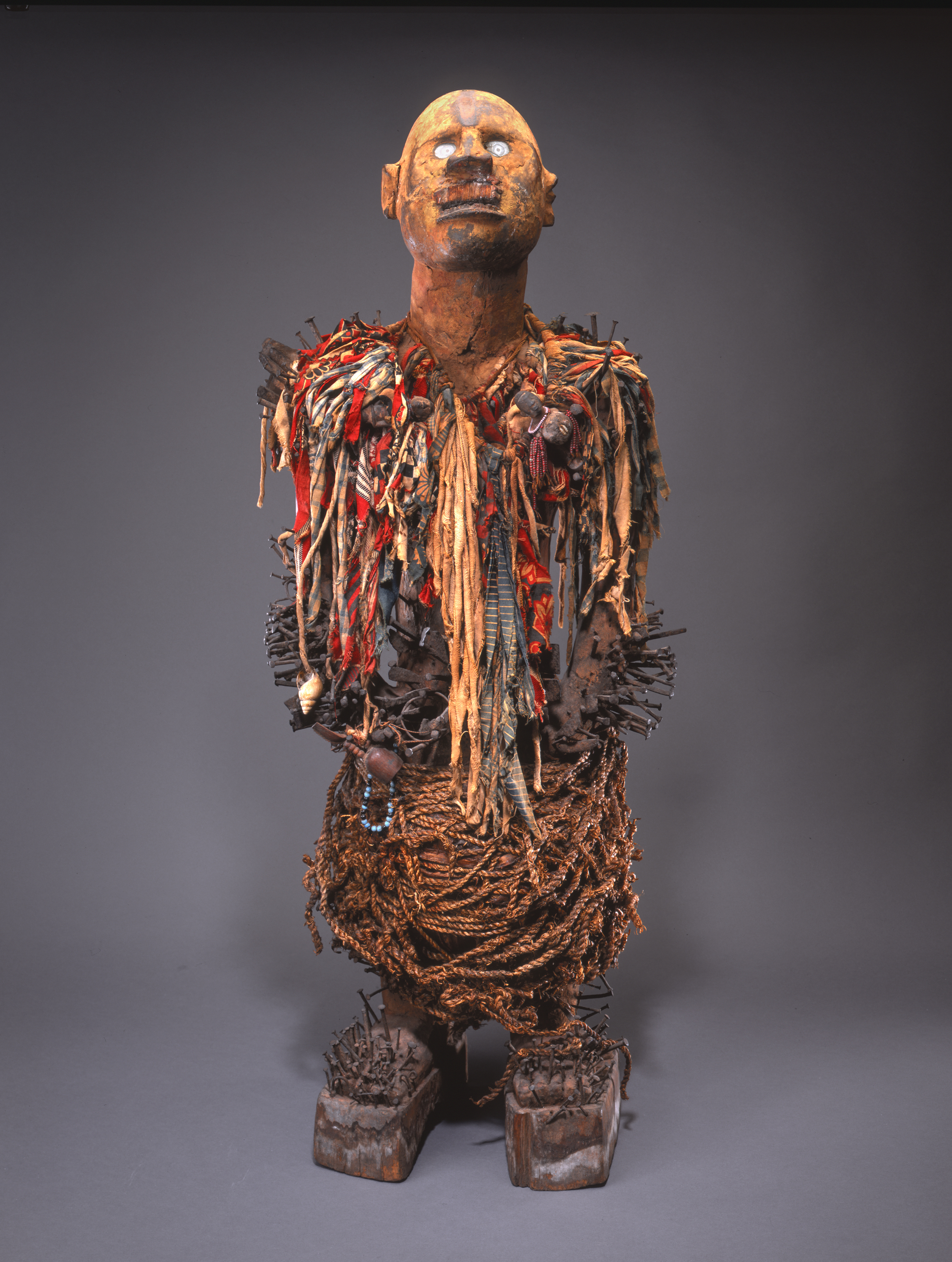
Power figure (nkisi nkondi), Yombe peoples, Democratic Republic of the Congo, 18th–19th century

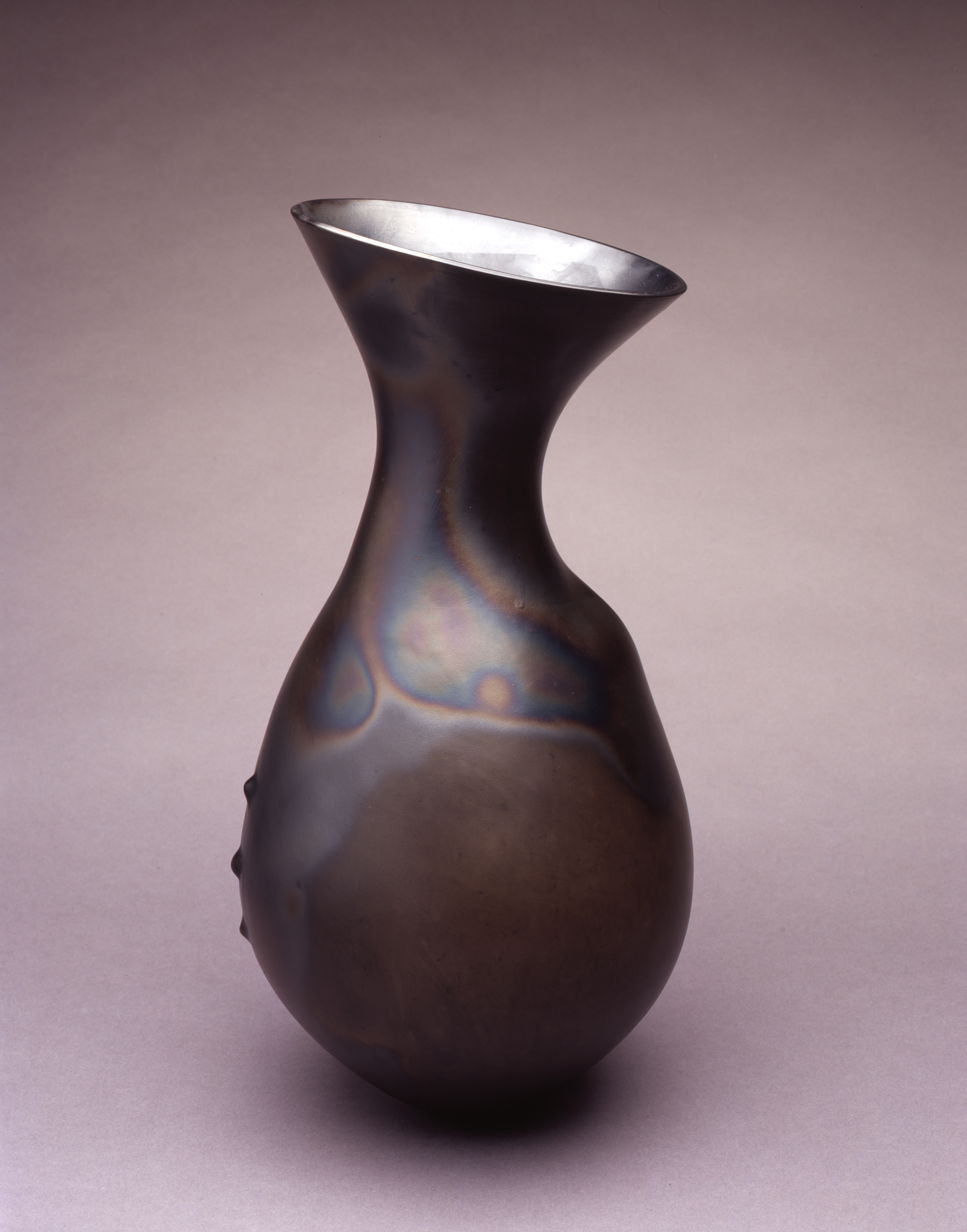
Ceramic, Magdalene Odundo (Kenya, b. 1950)

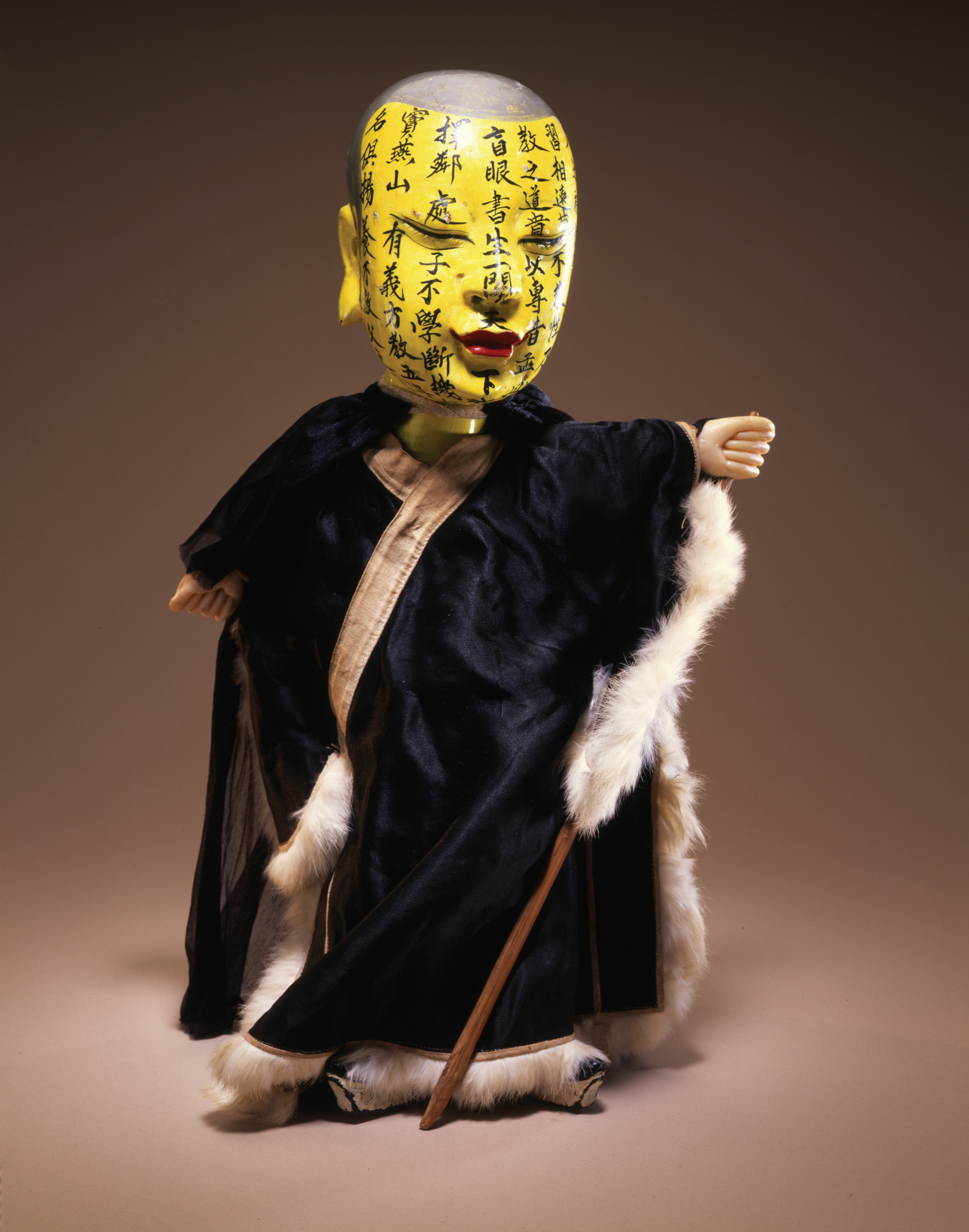
Hand puppet, the Blind Scholar, Chinese, Taiwan, Early–mid-20th century

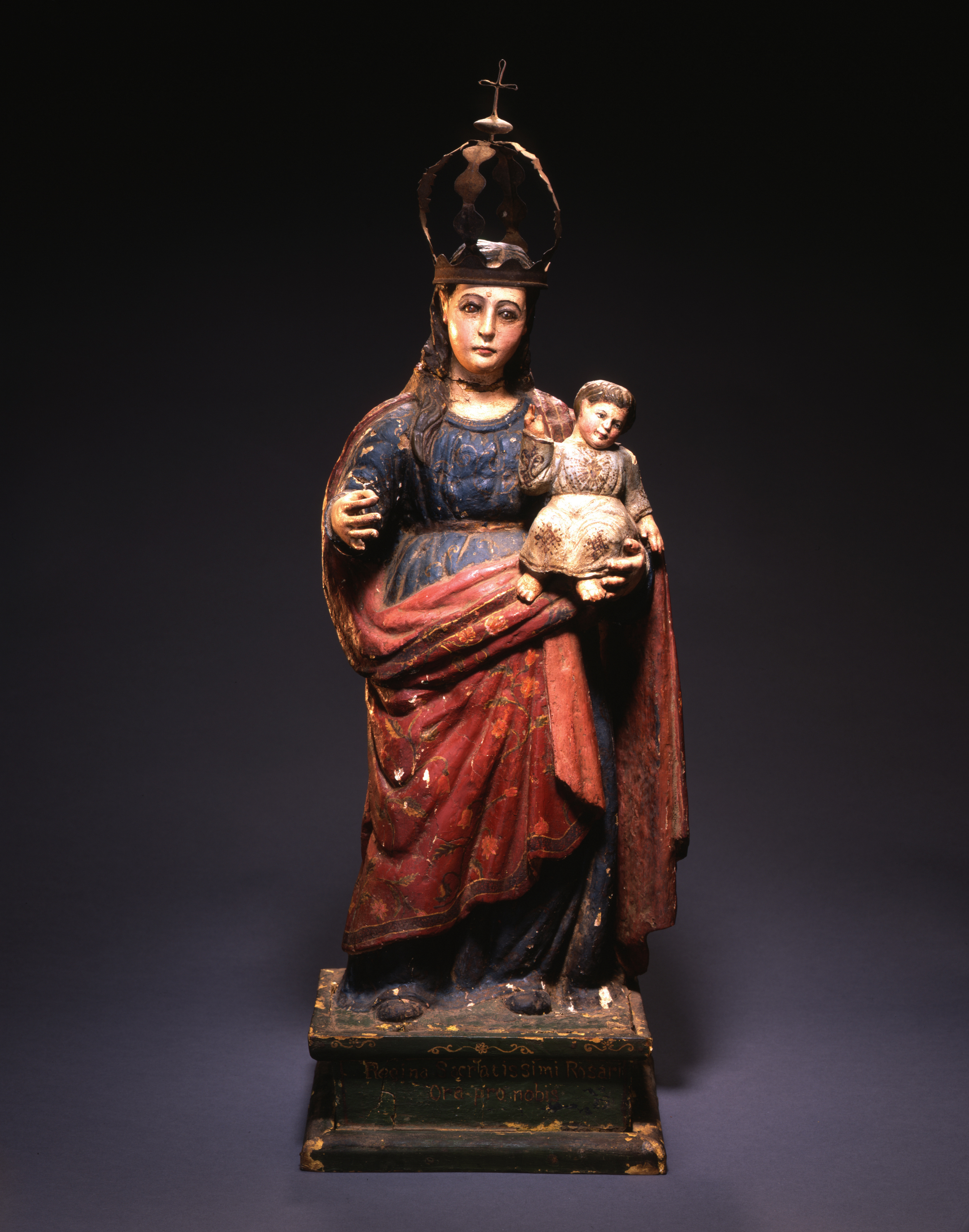
Santo, Virgin of the Rosary, Guatemala, Early 20th century

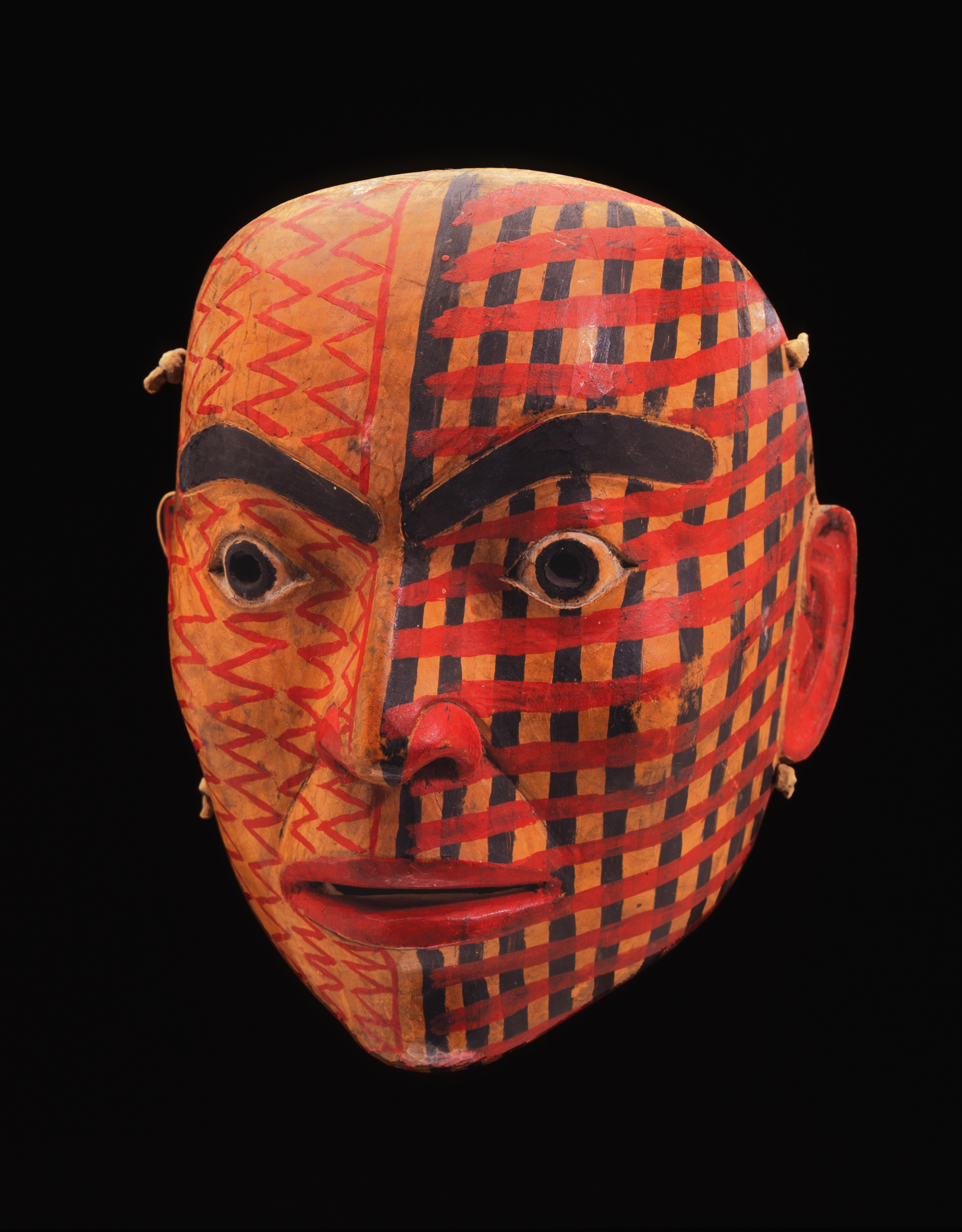
Mask (amiilk), Tsimshian peoples, British Columbia, Canada, 19th century

== Directors ==
- Christopher B. Donnan (1981–1996)
- Doran H. Ross (1996–2001)
- Marla C. Berns (2001–2021)
- Silvia Forni (2022–present)

In 2007, Berns' position was endowed by a $1 million donation from Los Angeles philanthropists Shirley and Ralph Shapiro in recognition of her contributions to UCLA and the community. In 2013, Berns received the medal of Chevalier of the Order of Arts and Letters of the French Republic in a ceremony conducted by Stéphane Martin, president of the Quai Branly Museum. The ceremony took place at the Quai Branly Museum in Paris on November 12, at the opening of Secrets d'ivoire: L'art des Lega d'Afrique centrale, an exhibition of the Fowler Museum's collection of African artwork by the Lega peoples of the Democratic Republic of the Congo, which was donated to the Fowler by collectors Jay T. and Deborah R. Last.
