= Eric Partridge =

20th-century New Zealand-born lexicographer, editor, and author (1894–1979)

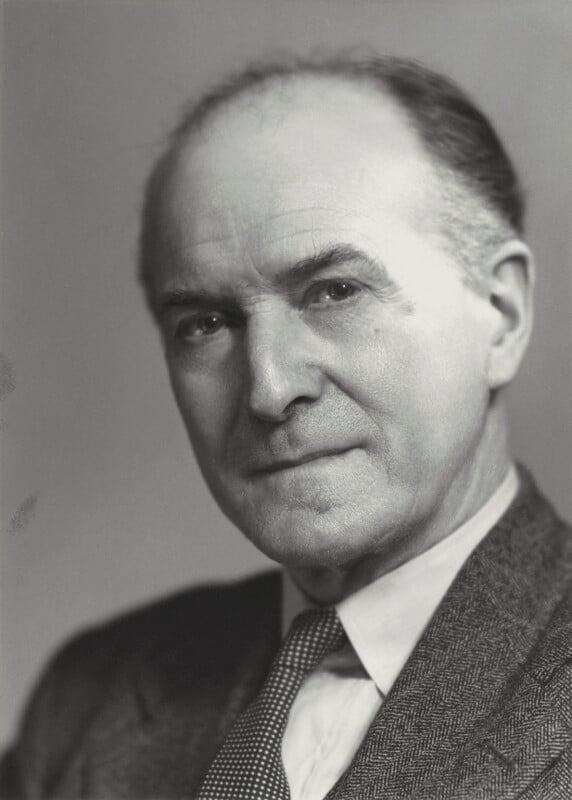
Partridge in 1953

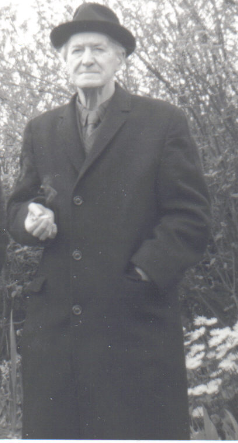
Partridge in 1971

Eric Honeywood Partridge (6 February 1894 – 1 June 1979) was a New Zealand–British lexicographer of the English language, particularly of its slang. His writing career was interrupted only by his service in the Army Education Corps and the RAF correspondence department during World War II.

== Early life ==
Partridge was born in the Waimata Valley, near Gisborne, on the North Island of New Zealand to John Thomas Partridge, a grazier, and his wife Ethel Annabella Norris. In 1908 the family moved to Queensland, Australia, where he was educated at the Toowoomba Grammar School. He studied classics and then French and English at the University of Queensland.

During this time Partridge also worked for three years as a schoolteacher before enrolling in the Australian Imperial Force in April 1915 and serving in the Australian infantry during the First World War, in Egypt, Gallipoli and on the Western Front, before being wounded in the Battle of Pozières. His interest in slang and the "underside" of language is said to date from his wartime experience. Partridge returned to university between 1919 and 1921, when he received his BA.

== Career ==
After receiving his degree, Partridge became Queensland Travelling Fellow at Balliol College, Oxford, where he worked on both an MA on eighteenth-century English romantic poetry, and a B.Litt in comparative literature. He subsequently taught in a grammar school in Lancashire for a brief interval, then in the two years beginning September 1925, took lecturing positions at the Universities of Manchester and London. From 1923, he "found a second home", occupying the same desk (K1) in the British Museum Library (as it was then known) for the next fifty years. In 1925 he married Agnes Dora Vye-Parminter, who in 1933 bore a daughter, Rosemary Ethel Honeywood Mann. In 1927 he founded the Scholartis Press, which he managed until it closed in 1931.

During the twenties he wrote fiction under the pseudonym 'Corrie Denison'; Glimpses, a book of stories and sketches, was published by the Scholartis Press in 1928. The Scholartis Press published more than 60 books in these four years, including Songs and Slang of the British Soldier 1914-1918, which Partridge co-authored with John Brophy. From 1932 he commenced writing in earnest. His next major work on slang, Slang Today and Yesterday, appeared in 1933, and his well-known Dictionary of Slang and Unconventional English followed in 1937.

During the Second World War, Partridge served in the Army Education Corps, later transferring to the RAF's correspondence department, before returning to his British Museum desk in 1945.

Partridge wrote more than forty books on the English language, including well-known works on etymology and slang. He also wrote books on tennis, which he played well. His papers are archived at the University of Birmingham, British Library, King's College, Cambridge, the Royal Institute of British Architects, the University of Exeter, the University of San Francisco, Warwickshire Record Office, and William Salt Library.

In summing up the contributions of Partridge to English language, Leo Rosten had inferred in 1985, "If one must limit an appraisal of Partridge's torrential work to but one adjective, the choice is a breeze: stupendous."

He died in Moretonhampstead, Devon, in 1979, aged 85.

== Selected works ==
- Three Personal Records of the War (with R. H. Mottram and John Easton). Scholartis Press, 1929; republished as Three Men's War: The Personal Records of Active Service (1930).
- Songs and Slang of the British Soldier (with John Brophy). Scholartis Press, 1931.
- A Charm of Words. New York, Macmillan Co., 1961 (copyright 1960).
- A New Testament Word Book: a Glossary. London, George Routledge & Sons, 1940; republished New York, Books for Libraries Press, 1970. The 1987 republication by the Christian publisher Barbour & Company of Uhricksville, Ohio as The Book of New Testament Word Studies, with copyright claimed by the publisher, appears to be a copyright violation.
- The 'Shaggy Dog' Story. New York: Philosophical Library, 1954.
- A Dictionary of the Underworld. London, Macmillan Co., 1949; reprinted with new addenda, New York: Bonanza Books, 1961.
- From Sanskrit to Brazil: Vignettes and Essays upon Languages. Hamish Hamilton, 1952. Reprinted 1969, Freeport, New York: Books for Libraries Press. ISBN 0-8369-5055-0.
- The Gentle Art of Lexicography as pursued and experienced by an addict (1963), New York: The Macmillan Company.
- Here, There and Everywhere. Hamish Hamilton.
- Name into Word. Secker & Warburg.
- A Dictionary of Catch Phrases. Routledge & Kegan Paul (UK)/Stein and Day (US). First published 1977. 2nd edition 1985. Paperback 1986. e-print 2005 ISBN 0-203-37995-0
- A Dictionary of Clichés. Routledge & Kegan Paul. First published 1940. E-print 2005. ISBN 0-203-37996-9
- A Dictionary of Forces' Slang.
- A Dictionary of RAF Slang. Michael Joseph, 1945; new edition with an introduction by Russell Ash, Pavilion Books, 1990. ISBN 978-1-85145-526-3
- Routledge Dictionary of Historical Slang.
- Origins: A Short Etymological Dictionary of Modern English (1958). Reprint: New York: Greenwich House, 1983. ISBN 0-517-41425-2. Reprint: Random House Value Publishing (1988)
- A Dictionary of Slang and Unconventional English. 1st edition: London: Routledge & Kegan Paul, 1937.
  2nd edition 1938
  3rd edition 1949
  4th edition 1951
  5th edition in two volumes, supplement much enlarged, 1961. Reprinted in 1 vol. 1963. Adelaide, South Australia: Mary Martin Books.
  6th edition 1967
  7th edition 1970
  8th edition London and New York: Routledge, 1984. Paperback reprint 2002
- Shakespeare's Bawdy. London, Routledge & Kegan Paul (1947)/New York, E. P. Dutton & Co. (1948), Reprint: Routledge (1991), ISBN 0-415-05076-6. Routledge Classics 2001, Hardback ISBN 0-415-25553-8; Paperback ISBN 0-415-25400-0.
- Slang Today and Yesterday. Routledge & Kegan Paul.
- A Smaller Slang Dictionary.
- You Have A Point There: A Guide to Punctuation and its Allies. First published 1953 by Hamish Hamilton Ltd. Taylor & Francis, e-print 2005. ISBN 0-203-37992-6.
- Usage and Abusage: A Guide to Good English. Hamish Hamilton/Penguin Books. Reprint: W. W. Norton & Company (1997). ISBN 0-393-31709-9.
- Name This Child. Hamish Hamilton.
- Name Your Child. Evans Bros.
- Eric Partridge in His Own Words. Edited by David Crystal. 1980. New York: Macmillan Publishing Co. ISBN 0-02-528960-8.

As 'Corrie Denison',

- Glimpses. Scholartis Press, 1928.
- "From Two Angles", a long story telling the story of the First World War from two points of view, and including many soldiers' songs, is included in A Martial Medley, Scholartis Press, 1931.

== See also ==
- Slang dictionary

== References and sources ==
Sources

- Crystal, D. (1981). Eric Partridge in his own words. New York: Macmillan.
- Serle, Geoffrey (1988), "Partridge, Eric Honeywood (1894–1979)", Australian Dictionary of Biography, Volume 11, Melbourne University Press.
- Rosten, L. (1985). Partridge's Slanguage. Encountervol. 64, no.2, pp. 27-29.
