= A Dictionary of Slang and Unconventional English =

1937 dictionary by Eric Partridge

- First edition
- Author: Eric Partridge
- Language: English
- Subject: Slang
- Publisher: Routledge
- Publication date: 1937
- ISBN: 978-0-415-29189-7
- OCLC: 499105143

A Dictionary of Slang and Unconventional English is a dictionary of slang originally compiled by the noted lexicographer of the English language Eric Partridge. The first edition was published in 1937 and seven editions were eventually published by Partridge. An eighth edition was published in 1984, after Partridge's death, by editor Paul Beale; in 1990 Beale published an abridged version, Partridge's Concise Dictionary of Slang and Unconventional English.

The dictionary was updated in 2005 by Tom Dalzell and Terry Victor as The New Partridge Dictionary of Slang and Unconventional English, and again in 2007 as The Concise New Partridge Dictionary of Slang and Unconventional English, which has additional entries compared to the 2005 edition, but omits the extensive citations.

== Original publication ==
Partridge published seven editions of his "hugely influential" slang dictionary before his death in 1979. The dictionary was "regarded as filling a lexicographical gap" in the English language because it contained entries on words that had long been omitted from other works, such as the Oxford English Dictionary. For the two editions published before the Second World War, obscenity laws prohibited full printing of vulgar words; Partridge therefore substituted asterisks for the vowels of words considered obscene.

The New York Times offered a "glowing" review of the 1937 first edition. Literary critic Edmund Wilson praised the dictionary, stating that the work "ought to be acquired by every reader who wants his library to have a sound lexicographical foundation". In 1985, John Gross of The New York Times called A Dictionary of Slang and Unconventional English "the nearest thing to a standard work in its field". In a 2002 review of the eighth edition, University College London Professor of English John Mullan argued that the "strength and weakness" of the dictionary was Partridge's "willingness to include his opinions [on word etymology] in what presented itself as a work of reference". However, Mullan also argued that by 2002 the dictionary entries were growing continually further out of date and out of touch with modern slang usages.

In 1972, an abridgement (by Jacqueline Simpson) of the 1961 edition was published by Penguin Reference Books as A Dictionary of Historical Slang.

== Update following Partridge's death ==
Following the seventh published edition of A Dictionary of Slang and Unconventional English in 1969, Eric Partridge had collected new material for another edition until his 1979 death. Prior to his death, Partridge "designated a successor", librarian and former military intelligence officer Paul Beale (who had contributed military slang to Partridge's efforts since 1974), and the lexicographical work was continued. The Eighth edition of A Dictionary of Slang and Unconventional English was published by Macmillan as a single-volume work in 1984. Beale also published in 1990 a condensed version of the dictionary, titled Partridge's Concise Dictionary of Slang and Unconventional English.

== Twenty-first century update ==
In 2004, editors Tom Dalzell and Terry Victor published The New Partridge Dictionary of Slang and Unconventional English, a two-volume update of the dictionary. Dalzell and Victor were chosen by the publisher Routledge to update the Partridge dictionary; this edition is, however, completely new and unrelated to the previous versions. A concise edition was published in 2007. It has about 60,000 entries, and "contains every entry in New Partridge as well as several hundred new words that have come into the slang lexicon since 2005", but omits the extensive citations of the 2005 edition, thus coming bound in slightly over 700 pages of only one volume compared to over 4000 pages for the unabridged, two-volume edition.
