= Jonathon Green =

English lexicographer (born 1948)

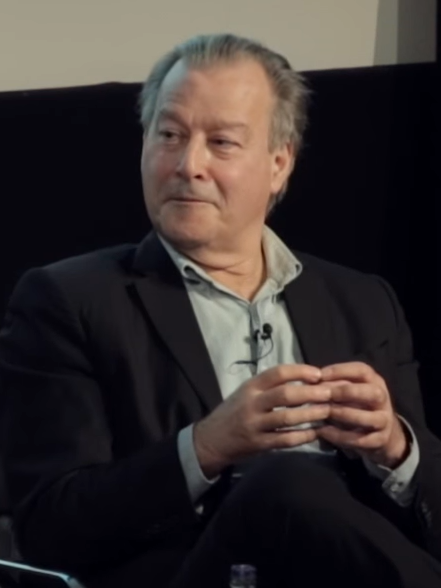
- Green in 2016
- Born: 1948 (age 77–78); United Kingdom
- Occupation: Lexicographer of slang

Academic background
- Education: Brasenose College, Oxford

Jonathon Green (born 1948) is an English lexicographer of slang and writer on the history of alternative cultures.

== Early life and education ==
Jonathon Green was born in 1948. Of Jewish origin, he was educated at Bedford School (1961–1965) and Brasenose College, Oxford (1966–1969), where he read history.

== Career ==
Several of Green's published books have focussed on sixties counterculture. After publishing All Dressed Up: The Sixties and the Counterculture (1998) he was taken to court for libel by both former Beatle George Harrison and artist Caroline Coon, and the book was withdrawn for 12 months. In June 2000, Coon received damages of £40,000, plus £33,000 costs, from publisher Random House, and received an official apology from Green for making false claims.

The book was later republished with the libellous passages removed.

== Authority on slang ==
The single-volume Chambers Slang Dictionary (Chambers Harrap) was first published in 1998; a second edition appeared in October 2008.

Green's most substantial work in this field is Green's Dictionary of Slang: a three-volume slang work which traces the history of English slang vocabulary over the last five centuries, with citations to printed works going back to the 1500s. Written over seventeen years beginning in 1993, the print edition was published in 2010; an online edition went live in 2016. It was awarded the 2012 Dartmouth Medal, an annual award from the Reference and User Services Association recognising the most outstanding reference work of the year.

== Accolades ==
Green has been described as the English-speaking world's leading lexicographer of slang, and has even been described as "the most acclaimed British lexicographer since Johnson".

== Publications ==
=== Author ===
- Newspeak: A Dictionary of Jargon (1983)
- The Dictionary of Contemporary Slang (1984, 1992, 1995)
- The Slang Thesaurus (1986, 1999)
- The A–Z of Nuclear Jargon (1986)
- The Dictionary of Jargon (1987 RKP)
- Neologisms: A Dictionary of Contemporary Coinages (1991)
- Slang Down the Ages: The Historical Development of Slang (1993)
- Words Apart: The Language of Prejudice (1996)
- Chasing The Sun: Dictionary-Makers and the Dictionaries They Made (1996)
- Cassell Dictionary of Slang (1998, 2005)
- Big Book of Filth (1999)
- Big Book of Being Rude (2000)
- Big Book of Bodily Functions (2001)
- Talking Dirty: A Slang Phrasebook (2003)
- The Stories of Slang (2017)
- Sounds and Furies: The Love-Hate Relationship between Women and Slang (2019)
- Famous Last Words (1979, 1997)
- Contemporary Dictionary of Quotations (1982)
- The Cynics' Lexicon (1984)
- Cassell Dictionary of Insulting Quotations (1996 Cassell, p/b 1997)
- Days In The Life: Voices from the English Underground 1961–1971 (1988)
- Them: Voices from the Immigrant Community in Contemporary Britain (1990)
- It: Sex Since the Sixties (1993)
- Language!/The Vulgar Tongue (2013 Oxford US)
- The Encyclopedia of Censorship (1990)
- All Dressed Up: The Sixties and the Counterculture (1998)
- Cutting it Fine: Inside the Restaurant Business, with Andrew Parkinson (2000)
- Cannabis: A History (2002)

=== Contributor ===
- The Language Report, ed. Susie Dent (2005, 2006)
- Elsevier Encyclopedia of Language and Linguistics, 2nd edition: contributor, 'Anglophone Slang Lexicography'
- Dictionary of National Biography, revised edition: contributor, 'Eric Partridge', 'Sapper [H.C. McNeile]'
- Bloomsbury Good Word Guide (1988, 1990, 1994), contributing editor: Slang and Jargon entries
