= Francis Constable =

English bookseller and publisher

Francis Constable (1592 – 1 August 1647) was a London bookseller and publisher of the Jacobean and Caroline eras, noted for publishing a number of stage plays of English Renaissance drama.

(Francis Constable the publisher is distinct from his contemporary, Francis Constable, esquire, of Burstwick in Yorkshire. Many members of the northern family, earlier and later, shared the name Francis Constable.)

== Life and work ==
Francis Constable was baptised on 12 May 1592, in Datchet, Buckinghamshire (now co. Berkshire). He was the son of Robert Constable and Margery Barker, the daughter of Christopher Barker, printer to Queen Elizabeth I. Francis had an elder brother Robert Constable baptised at Datchet on 9 September 1590. His brother Robert was apprenticed on 7 December 1607 at the age of 17 to their maternal uncle Robert Barker, printer to James I of England.

It is also believed that Francis may have been apprenticed to his maternal uncle Robert Barker, who, holding the Bible patent that he had inherited from his father, in 1611 printed the first edition of the King James Bible while Robert & Francis were still apprentices. Francis became a "freedman" (a full member) of the Stationers Company on 2 July 1614. His elder brother Robert became a "freedman" on 12 December 1614.

Francis established his independent business at a series of locations in London and Westminster: first at the sign of the White Lion in St Paul's Churchyard, from 1616–1624; then under the sign of the Crane, also in St. Paul's Churchyard, 1631; then "under St. Martin's Church" in Ludgate, 1637; then at King Street in Westminster, at the sign of the Goat, 1640, and at Westminster Hall, 1640. It is probable that he rented a stall in Westminster Hall very much earlier than 1640 but that is the first appearance of the Hall in the imprint of any book.

In his career, Constable sometimes partnered with Humphrey Moseley, one of the most prominent publishers of drama and literature in Constable's generation; he also partnered with other stationers on specific projects.

Richard Constable, believed to be a relation of Francis Constable (possibly the son of his brother Robert Constable), was active as a bookseller in the late 1640s.

Francis Constable died 1 August 1647 and was buried the following day at St Margaret, Westminster His wife Alice was buried 2 days later on 4 August 1647, and his only surviving son Robert, at the age of 16 or close to it, was buried on 28 August 1647. It was after Robert's death that the will of Alice Constable was filed for probate on 22 September 1647. It is believed that they died of the plague that was killing many in London that summer.

== Drama ==
- Constable's first registered publication was a drama, the first edition of Samuel Daniel's "pastoral tragicomedy" Hymen's Triumph (January 1615).

He published large numbers of plays, in which he was associated for some years with Humphrey Moseley.

Among Constable's other publications in drama were:

- the first quarto of Beaumont and Fletcher's The Maid's Tragedy, in partnership with stationer Richard Higgenbotham (1619);
  - the second quarto of the same play (1622);
- Thomas Middleton's A Chaste Maid in Cheapside (1630);
- Pathomachia (1630);
- James Shirley's Love Tricks, as The School of Compliment (1631);
  - a second edition of the same play (1637);
- Philip Massinger and Nathan Field's The Fatal Dowry (1632);
- William Rowley's A New Wonder, a Woman Never Vexed (1632);
- Richard Brome's The Antipodes (1640);
- Brome's The Sparagus Garden (1640);
- Henry Glapthorne's The Lady's Privilege (1640);
- Glapthorne's Wit in a Constable (1640).

Constable worked with many London printers on these and other projects, including Richard and Thomas Cotes, Nicholas Okes and his son John Okes, and Elizabeth Allde, among others.

== Other works ==
Inevitably, Constable also published a wide variety of other literature beyond the drama. He published the second edition of William Vaughan's The Spirit of Detraction in 1630. He issued multiple editions of Thomas Scott's satire Philomythie, or Philomythologie, Wherein Outlandish Birds Beasts and Fishes are Taught to Speak True English Plainly, in 1616 and after; and multiple editions of Henry Peacham the younger's The Complete Gentleman, from 1622 on. He published items of the religious literature that was so common in the era, like Alexander Ross's Three Decades of Divine Meditations (1630). And religious poetry: Richard Braithwaite's The Psalms of David (1638). He published Peacham's Thalia's Banquet in 1620, and his elegy Thestylis Astrata in 1634; and Glapthorne's poem Whitehall in 1643. Constable also was responsible for texts in medicine and anatomy.

And Constable also issued works of social criticism and contemporary controversies, like Machiavel's Ghost, as He Lately Appeared to His Dear Sons, the Modern Projectors (1641; attributed to John Taylor the Water Poet). He issued one notable volume in the utopian literature, Samuel Hartlib's A Description of the Famous Kingdom of Macaria (1641) – plus a supply of political and legal materials involving the start of the English Civil War and the Commonwealth era.

== Family ==
Francis Constable and his wife Alice had fifteen children:

1. Alice, baptised 24 September 1615, St. Gregory by St. Paul, London.
2. Sarah, baptised 16 March 1616/7, St. Gregory by St. Paul, London. (Married Anthony Savage aft. 6 October 1646 at London.) She and her husband were among those who presented the will of her mother for probate.
3. Joan, baptised 11 September 1618, St. Gregory by St. Paul, London.
4. Mary, baptised 21 October 1619, St. Andrew, Enfield, Middlesex. She was among those who presented her mother's will for probate.
5. Elizabeth, baptised 24 October 1620, St. Gregory by St. Paul, London.
6. Anne, baptised 21 February 1621/2, St. Gregory by St. Paul, London.
7. Margaret, baptised 26 June 1623, St. Gregory by St. Paul, London. (Married Robert Hunny 1 July 1642 at St. Margaret, Westminster.)
8. Rachel, baptised 24 September 1624, St. Gregory by St. Paul, London.
9. Simon, baptised 14 August 1625, Datchet, Buckinghamshire; buried 29 November 1627, St. Andrew Undershaft, London.
10. Robert (twin), baptised 24 August 1626, St. Andrew Undershaft, London; buried 10 September 1626.
11. Roger (twin), baptised 24 August 1626, St. Andrew Undershaft, London; buried 10 September 1626.
12. Alice, baptised 16 March 1627/8, St. Andrew Undershaft, London.
13. Frances, baptised 5 July 1629, St. Andrew Undershaft, London. She was among those who presented her mother's will for probate.
14. Rachel, baptised 18 July 1630, St. Andrew Undershaft, London. She was among those who presented her mother's will for probate.
15. Robert, baptised 2 October 1631, St. Andrew Undershaft, London; buried 28 August 1647, St. Margaret, Westminster.

An interesting claim is made in many genealogies that one of Francis's daughters, Anne Constable, married Richard I Lee, an important figure in the colony of Virginia, who was the ancestor of Confederate General, Robert E. Lee.

== Francis Constable's father ==
When Francis's elder brother Robert was apprenticed in 1607 to their maternal uncle Robert Barker, their father was described as "Robert Constable, late of North Pickenham in co. Norfolk, gentleman, deceased". The Biographical History of Gonville and Caius College, 1349–1897 provides some more information. Francis's father Robert Constable was admitted to the College at Cambridge University at the age of 18 in March 1574. His father's younger brother Thomas was admitted at the age of 15 in February 1577. Francis Constable's grandfather was Robert Constable, and he was a yeoman, a minor land owner and small prosperous farmer. This is further substantiated by records held in The National Archives that show that in 1575 Robert Constable sold a messuage called Frostes in North Pickenham to George Constable (assumed to be a relative), and that he paid for both of his son's tuition and board at Cambridge. Both Robert Constable and his younger brother Thomas went to school for 4 years before going to University: Robert at Saxthorpe, Norfolkshire, and Thomas at both Norwich and Saxthorpe. Robert Constable spent a year at Pembroke College at Cambridge before joining Gonville and Caius College. His tutor at Gonville and Caius College was his 23-year-old cousin, Simon Canham, the son of Simon Canham (−1584) of Ashill, Norfolkshire (1½ miles from North Pickenham) and his wife Alice (−1603), who had been admitted to Gonville and Caius College a year before Robert Constable after first spending four years at St John's College, Cambridge. Francis's father Robert Constable received his Bachelor of Arts in 1577.

The Biographical History of Gonville and Caius College, 1349–1897 further tells us that Francis's father Robert Constable was a lawyer and a barrister as he was admitted to Lincoln's Inn in February 1582. It further tells us that the family would have suffered persecution as they were a "popish recusant family in 1588", refusing to attend services or take communion in the Church of England. There was a statute passed in 1593 that determined penalties against "Popish Recusants" including fines, property confiscation, and imprisonment. Further the Popish Recusants Act 1605 forbade Roman Catholics from practising the professions of law and medicine. This would explain why Francis and his brother Robert Constable went into the printing trade of their maternal uncle rather than follow their father into law.

There is a record at the Norfolk Record Office for the will of a Thomas Constable of Ashill from the period 1536–1545. It is possible that this Thomas Constable is Francis's great or greatx2-grandfather, and the father or grandfather of Robert Constable of North Pickenham. Many genealogies claim that Francis Constable is the great-grandson of Thomas Constable M.P. (c.1506-aft.1558) of Great Grimsby, Lincolnshire and his 1st wife Barbara Catherall of Great Grimsby, and the great-grandson of Sir Robert Constable (c.1478–1537) of Flamburgh (Flamborough), Yorkshire and his wife Jane Ingleby of Ripley, Yorkshire. This, however, cannot be substantiated. Even though it is highly likely that Thomas Constable M.P. of Great Grimsby had a son named Robert after his father, there is no evidence and no reason to believe that this son was Robert Constable of North Pickenham, Francis's grandfather. There are many Constable families in England, and many Robert Constables in that period.

== Ancestry ==
Ancestors of Francis Constable

4. Robert I Constable; of North Pickenham, Norfolkshire (c. 1529-)
2. Robert II Constable; of North Pickenham, Norfolkshire (c. 1555-bef. 1607)
1. Francis Constable; (1592–1647)
6. Christopher Barker, printer to Queen Elizabeth I (c. 1529–1599)
3. Margery Barker; (c. 1555-)

== See also ==
- Robert Allot
- William Aspley
- Edward Blount
- Walter Burre
- Cuthbert Burby
- Philip Chetwinde
- Crooke and Cooke
- Richard Hawkins
- Henry Herringman
- William Jaggard
- William Leake
- John and Richard Marriot
- John Martyn
- Augustine Matthews
- William Ponsonby
- Humphrey Robinson
- John Smethwick
- Thomas Thorpe
- Thomas Walkley
