= Walter Burre =

English bookseller and publisher (fl. 1597–1622)

Walter Burre (fl. 1597 – 1622) was a London bookseller and publisher of the Elizabethan and Jacobean eras, best remembered for publishing several key texts in English Renaissance drama.

Burre was made a "freeman" of the Stationers Company — meaning that he became a full-fledged member of the London guild of booksellers — in 1596. From 1597 to 1622 he did business in a sequence of three London shops; the most important was at the sign of the Crane in St Paul's Churchyard (1604 and after).

== Drama and Literature ==
In the span of a decade, Burre published the first editions of four plays by Ben Jonson:

- Every Man in His Humour, 1601
- Cynthia's Revels, 1601
- The Alchemist, 1610
- Catiline: His Conspiracy, 1611.

Beyond the confines of the Jonson canon, Burre issued a number of other first quartos of Elizabethan and Jacobean plays — Thomas Nashe's Summer's Last Will and Testament (1600), Thomas Middleton's A Mad World, My Masters (1608), Thomas Tomkis's Albumazar (1615), George Ruggle's Ignoramus (also 1615), and perhaps most importantly, Francis Beaumont's The Knight of the Burning Pestle (1613). In the latter volume, Burre wrote the dedicatory letter to Robert Keysar, shareholder and manager of the Queen's Revels Children, the company of boy actors that had premiered the play in 1607; Burre congratulated Keysar on preserving the play after its initial failure, which Burre explained by noting that the audience failed to understand the "privy mark of irony" in the work.

(One scholar, Zachary Lesser, has argued that Burre specialised in publishing plays that had initially failed on the stage. This would certainly apply to Beaumont's play, and to Cynthia's Revels and Catiline.)

== Other works ==
Burre also published works of non-dramatic literature: Pseudo-Martyr (1610), the first printed work of John Donne; a translation of the Pharsalia of Lucan by Sir Arthur Gorges (1614); and Sir Walter Raleigh's The History of the World (also 1614). One story, current throughout the seventeenth century, held that when Burre told Raleigh how poorly that book was selling, Raleigh threw the completed second volume of the work into the nearest fire. This story is certainly apocryphal, since The History of the World in fact sold well, going through three editions in its first three years in print.

== Exploration ==
Burre's link with Raleigh was not an anomaly: Burre was well-connected with both the Virginia Company and the East India Company, and published many volumes on exploration and related sublects, including some involving the early Pilgrims. When the East India Company's second voyage to the East returned to London in May 1606, Burre issued the anonymously-authored account of the trip, The Last East-India Voyage, within a month. (Burre was the brother-in-law of Sir Henry Middleton, commander of the venture.) Burre similarly published the first law books of the Jamestown colony for the Virginia Company, along with a series of books on surveying, trade, and tobacco growing. (He published An Advice How to Plant Tobacco in England in 1615 — which somehow failed to lead to a thriving tobacco agriculture in the British Isles.)

== Miscellaneous ==
Burre also published a wide variety of books on many subjects, works now almost entirely forgotten, ranging from Thomas Wright's The Passions of the Mind in General (1601, 1604) to Sir Thomas Culpeper's A Tract Against The High Rate of Usury (1621).

== See also ==
- Robert Allot
- William Aspley
- Edward Blount
- Cuthbert Burby
- Philip Chetwinde
- Francis Constable
- Thomas Cotes
- Thomas Creede
- Crooke and Cooke
- Richard Field
- Richard Hawkins
- Henry Herringman
- William Jaggard
- John and Richard Marriot
- John Martyn
- Augustine Matthews
- Richard Meighen
- Humphrey Moseley
- William Ponsonby
- Humphrey Robinson
- Peter Short
- Valentine Simmes
- John Smethwick
- Thomas Thorpe
- Thomas Walkley
