= William Leake =

Father and son publishers of the late 16th and 17th centuries

William Leake, father (died 1633) and son (died 1681), were London publishers and booksellers of the late sixteenth and the seventeenth centuries. They were responsible for a range of texts in English Renaissance drama and poetry, including works by Shakespeare and Beaumont and Fletcher.

== Senior ==
William Leake I, or William Leake the elder, started in business as a bookseller around 1586. His shops were at the sign of the Greyhound in Paternoster Row, and at the sign of the Holy Ghost in St. Paul's Churchyard. In 1596 he acquired the rights to Shakespeare's Venus and Adonis from John Harrison the elder, and published six editions of that very popular poem from 1599 to 1602 in literature (the fifth through tenth editions, or the third octavo edition, O3, through the eighth, O8).

The elder Leake published the first quartos of Anthony Munday's two plays about Robin Hood, The Downfall and The Death of Robert Earl of Huntington (both 1601). Leake published editions of John Lyly's Euphues the tenth edition (both parts) in 1605, the eleventh in 1607, the twelfth in 1607 (Part I) and 1609 (Part II), and the thirteenth in 1613. He issued Robert Southwell's Saint Peter's Complaint and Other Poems in 1595, and Thomas Greene's A Poet's Vision, and a Prince's Glory in 1603.

Leake also was responsible for volumes in a range of subjects apart from drama and literature. He published the religious books that were so common in his era — Henry Smith's The Sinner's Confession (1594) and William Fulke's A Most Pleasant Prospect into the Garden of Natural Contemplation (1602) are two examples. And he published the kind of romances of chivalry that were the great bestsellers of the age, like The Knight of the Sea (1600) and The Third and Last Part of Palmerin of England (1602).

William Leake the elder was selected as Master of the Stationers Company in 1618. He retired from business after his term as master of his guild was completed.

== Junior ==
William Leake II, or the younger, became a "freedman" (a full member) of the Stationers Company on 22 June 1623. The gap between his father's career and his own means that the younger Leake did not inherit an established business from his parent — though his father did leave him £600 and the family plate in his last will and testament. The younger Leake set himself up as an independent bookseller by 1635. His shop was located as the sign of the Crown in Fleet Street, and later in Chancery Lane. On 1 June 1635 the Widow Leake transferred her late husband's copyrights to William II. In 1638 he obtained control of the copyrights of the late Richard Hawkins — and both of these consignments of rights contained play texts. This sparked the most active period of publishing across both of the Leake generations.

Even though the works of Shakespeare and Beaumont and Fletcher had been published in large folio collections by the middle of the seventeenth century (the Shakespeare First Folio in 1623 and the Second Folio in 1632; the first Beaumont and Fletcher folio in 1647), publishers continued to issue editions of individual plays when they judged there was a market for them. William Leake the younger issued several of these later editions:

- the 4th, 5th, 6th and 7th editions of A King and No King (1639, 1655, 1661, 1676);
- the 5th, 6th, and 7th editions of Philaster (1639, 1652, 1663?);
- the 5th and 6th editions of The Maid's Tragedy (1641, 1650);
- the 4th quarto of The Merchant of Venice (1652);
- the 3rd quarto of Othello (1655).

Leake also reprinted James Shirley's The Grateful Servant (1637) and The Wedding (1660), as well as multiple editions of Hero and Leander that included both Marlowe's original and Chapman's continuation (1637 and after).

Leake published first editions as well as reprints. In 1640 he issued John Gough's tragicomedy The Strange Discovery, and Christ's Passion, George Sandys's translation of a tragedy by Hugo Grotius.

And like his father (indeed like most publishers of his period), the younger Leake also published a variety of other types of books, including popular literature like The Pleasant History of Lazarillo de Tormes (sixth and subsequent editions, 1639 and after) and Le Prince D'Amour (1660), and serious works like Sir Thomas Urchard's Epigrams Divine and Moral (1646) and John Wilson's translation of The Praise of Folly of Eramus (1668). Leake the younger was also believed to be a friend of the Cotton Library during its direction under Sir Thomas Cotton, publishing such constitutional works as An Exact Abridgement of the Records in the Tower of London (1657) collated by politician William Prynne.

William Leake the younger was followed in his business by his son John Leake.

== See also ==
- Walter Burre
- Francis Constable
- Crooke and Cooke
- John and Richard Marriot
- John Martyn
- Humphrey Moseley
- William Ponsonby
- Humphrey Robinson
