= William Ponsonby (publisher) =

London publisher of the Elizabethan era

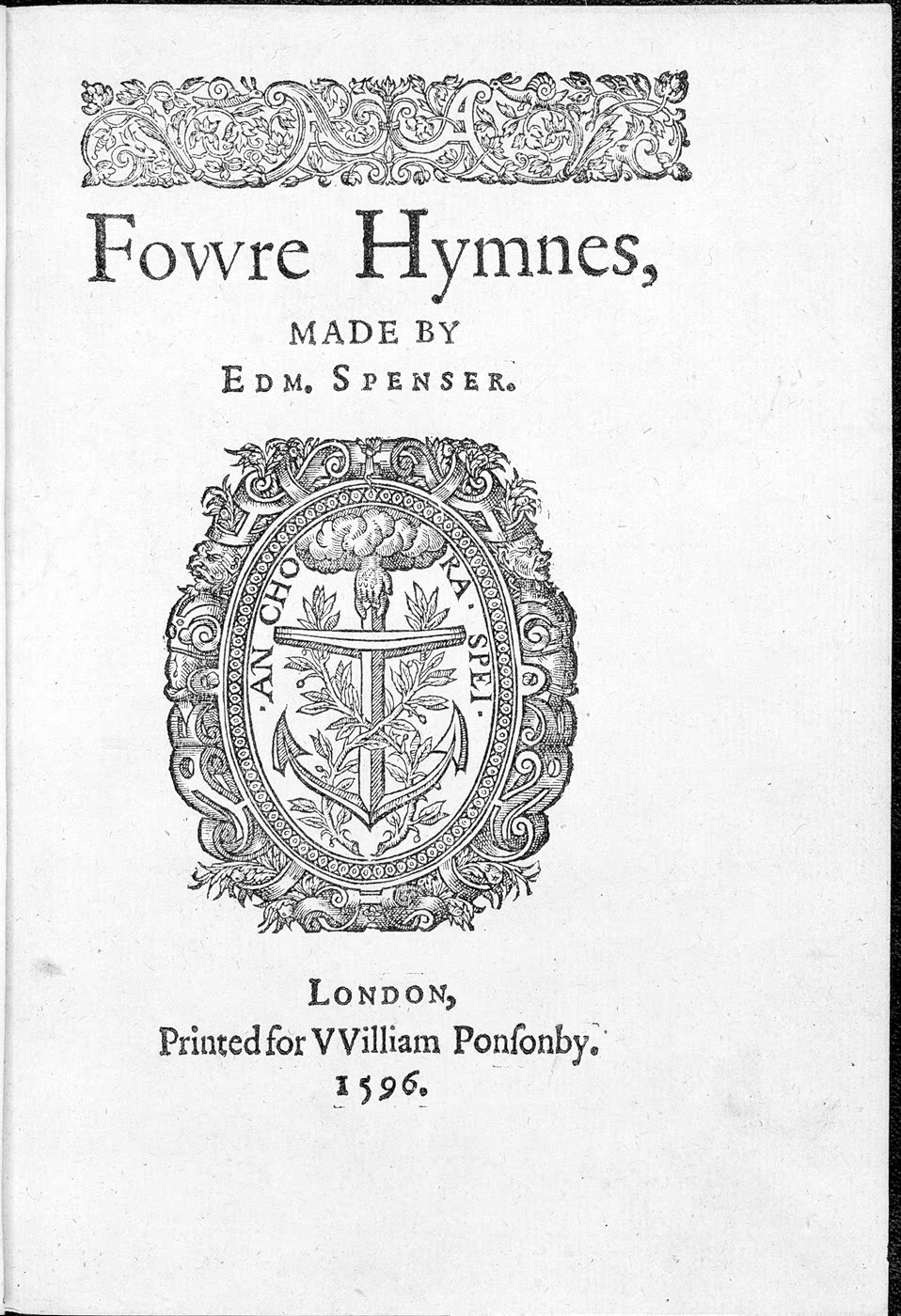
Title page, Fowre Hymnes, by Edmund Spenser, published by Richard Field (as indicated by the use of his distinctive printer's mark) for William Ponsonby, London, 1596

William Ponsonby (1546? – 1604) was a prominent London publisher of the Elizabethan era. Active in the 1577–1603 period, Ponsonby published the works of Edmund Spenser, Sir Philip Sidney, and other members of the Sidney circle; he has been called "the leading literary publisher of Elizabethan times."

Ponsonby completed his apprenticeship under stationer William Norton on 11 January 1571. Around 1576 he established his own bookshop at the sign of the Bishop's Head in St. Paul's Churchyard.

Ponsonby's relationship with the works of Spenser began when he issued the 1590 volume of The Faerie Queene, Books 1–3. Ponsonby published all of Spenser's future works, including the complete edition of The Faerie Queene in 1596; he issued the entire Spenserian canon except for the poet's earliest volume, The Shepherd's Calendar (1579).

In regard to Sidney, Ponsonby issued both the 1590 and 1593 editions of the Arcadia, the 1595 edition of The Defence of Poesie and the large 1598 folio collection that included Astrophil and Stella. The works of Sidney's sister Mary, Countess of Pembroke, including Antony (1592, 1595), her translation of Garnier's tragedy, were also published by Ponsonby.

Ponsonby nourished a reputation as an elite publisher, and so avoided what the Elizabethans considered lower-prestige product – like stage plays. Ponsonby printed none of the plays of English Renaissance drama that are such a strong focus of modern interest in his era, and he generally avoided the non-dramatic works of dramatists as well – though his 1583 edition of Robert Greene's Mamilia, Part II, and his 1594 publication of George Chapman's The Shadow of Night, are exceptions to this general trend. In 1595 Ponsonby tried to register ownership of Lewes Lewkenor's The Estate of English fugitives under the King of Spain and his ministers but the edition was printed, possibly piratically, by John Drawater, assistant to Thomas Blagrave Master of the Revels (Ponsonby's apprentice Edward Blount largely followed his master's example of avoiding plays during his own independent career – though Blount made a few exceptions, most notably the First Folio of Shakespeare's plays in 1623.) Ponsonby made occasional exceptions for closet drama, as with the Countess of Pembroke's Antony noted above.

In an age when the disciplines of publishing and printing were largely (though not entirely) separate, Ponsonby concentrated on publishing and commissioned professional printers to print his texts. The 1590 Faerie Queene volume, for example, was printed by John Wolfe, while Ponsonby's 1595 edition of Spenser's Amoretti and Epithalamion was printed by Peter Short. The 1583 Mamilia was printed by Thomas Creede.

On Ponsonby's death in 1604, many of his copyrights passed to his brother-in-law, stationer Simon Waterson.

== See also ==
- Robert Allot
- William Aspley
- Cuthbert Burby
- Walter Burre
- Philip Chetwinde
- Francis Constable
- Thomas Cotes
- Crooke and Cooke
- Richard Field
- Richard Hawkins
- Henry Herringman
- William Jaggard
- William Leake
- John and Richard Marriot
- John Martyn
- Richard Meighen
- Humphrey Moseley
- Humphrey Robinson
- John Smethwick
- Thomas Thorpe
- Thomas Walkley
