= John and Richard Marriot =

John Marriot (died 1657) and his son Richard Marriot (died 1679) were prominent London publishers and booksellers in the seventeenth century. For a portion of their careers, the 1645–57 period, they were partners in a family business.

== John Marriot ==
John Marriot maintained his London business from 1616 to 1657; his shop was at the sign of the "White Flower de Luce" in St. Dunstan's Churchyard in Fleet Street. Marriot published a wide range of books on many subjects, including the religious works that were a dominant feature of his era; John Meredith's The Sin of Blasphemy Against the Holy Ghost (1622) is only one of various possible examples. In 1618 Marriot became the publisher of the Royal College of Physicians, and published their Pharmacopoeia (1618, 1619) — though his relationship with the college would prove difficult and contentious. He published Barnabe Rich's The Irish Hubbub, or the English Hue and Cry in 1617, and John Murrell's A New Book of Cookery in 1631.

Yet the elder Marriot is most strongly associated with the publication of poetry and literary prose. He produced the first (defective) edition of the collected Poems of John Donne in 1633, plus subsequent (improved) editions in 1635, 1639, and down to 1650; he also issued volumes of Donne's sermons and other prose works. Marriot also published works of Michael Drayton, Nicholas Breton, Francis Quarles, John Davies of Hereford, George Wither, and others, some of them figures now deeply obscure (like the Poems of Robert Gomersall, in 1633).

John Marriot normally operated independently, though occasionally he joined in partnerships with other stationers to produce volumes that were unusually expensive or challenging. Partnered with colleague John Grismand, Marriot published the first edition of Lady Mary Wroth's controversial roman à clef The Countess of Montgomery's Urania in 1621. Marriot published relatively little of English Renaissance drama, though he did issue Philip Massinger's The Great Duke of Florence in 1636.

In 1645, John Marriot's son Richard joined in partnership with his father; books published by their firm after that date are generally assigned to both men. The title page of their first edition of Quarles's The Shepherds' Oracles (1646) credits the publication to "John Marriot and Thomas Marriot." The title page of the 1650 edition of Donne's Poems reads "Printed for John Marriot, and are to be sold by Richard Marriot...."

On 3 May 1651 John Marriot transferred many of his copyrights to his son; he appears to have entered a semi-retirement after that date.

== Richard Marriot ==
Richard Marriot actually began his career prior to his partnership with his father; he issued several works before 1645, including, in partnership with Richard Royston, a volume of Donne's Sermons in 1640. He remained in business past his father's retirement and death; his shop was located at the sign of the King's Head, "over against the Inner Temple gate" in Fleet Street near Chancery Lane. (The King's Head was a tavern, located upstairs over Marriot's shop.) He continued his father's brand of publishing, with some religious works, like Edward Sparke's Scintillula Altaris, or A Pious Reflection on Primitive Religion (1652) — yet he also concentrated on literary works. He published Donne's Letters (1651), and the first authorized edition Samuel Butler's Hudibras, Part 1 (1963).

He also published the first edition of the poetry of Katherine Philips in 1664 — a highly controversial move. "In a letter published in the 1667 edition of her poems, Katherine Philips used the metaphor of rape to describe the pirated manuscript published by Richard Marriot in 1664." Philips died of smallpox in the year Marriot's edition appeared; the book inspired a debate on whether Philips intended her work to appear in print, and on the propriety of publishing women's writing.

(Apparently Marriot was not shy about publishing without an author's permission. With sometime partner Henry Herringman, he issued a pirated collection of the poetry of Henry King, Bishop of Chichester, in 1657.)

In prose, the younger Marriot was notable as the publisher of Izaak Walton. He published the first edition of Walton's The Compleat Angler in 1653, plus subsequent editions (1655, 1661, 1668, 1676); he issued a number of Walton's other works too, in first and later editions. Walton called Marriot "my old friend" in his last will and testament, and left him £10; in the same document, Walton requested his son and namesake to "shew kindness to him [Marriot] if he shall need, and my son can spare it." Marriot issued other books on fishing, like Barker's Delight, or the Art of Angling, by Thomas Barker (1657), and Robert Venables' The Experienced Angler (1662). In partnership with Henry Brome, Marriot published Charles Cotton's continuation of Walton's Compleat Angler, sometimes called Cotton's Angler, in 1676.

Marriot also published books by Sir Henry Wotton, Sir Thomas Overbury, and others including Nathaniel Ingelo's Bentivolio and Urania, 1660. He was responsible for some striking literary curiosities. In 1646 he published Thomas Blount's The Art of Making Devices. Treating of Hieroglyphics, Symbols, Emblems, Ænigmas, Sentences, Parables, Reverses of Medals, Arms, Blazons, Cimiers, Cyphers, and Rebus. In 1656 he issued the second volume of an adventurer's memoirs, lushly titled The Legend of Captain Jones: continued from his first part to the end: wherein is delivered his incredible adventures and achievements by sea and land. Particularly his miraculous deliverance from a wrack at Sea by the support of a Dolphin. His several desperate duels. His combat with Bahader Cham a giant of the race of Og. His loves. His deep employments and happy success in business of State. All which, and more, is but the tithe of his own relation, which he continued until he grew speechless, and died.

Richard Marriot published more drama than his father had. He issued The Spanish Gypsy in 1653, and both Revenge for Honour and Webster's Appius and Virginia in 1654. (Each of these involved inaccurate attributions, The Spanish Gypsy to Thomas Middleton and William Rowley, and Revenge for Honour to George Chapman. In the third case, Heywood likely collaborated with Webster on Appius and Virginia.) In partnership with Humphrey Moseley and Thomas Dring, Marriot published Five New Plays by Richard Brome (1653), an important collection of first imprints of Brome works. And he partnered with Henry Herringman and John Martyn in the second Beaumont and Fletcher folio of 1679.

== See also ==
- Robert Allot
- William Aspley
- Edward Blount
- Cuthbert Burby
- Walter Burre
- Philip Chetwinde
- Crooke and Cooke
- Richard Hawkins
- William Jaggard
- Augustine Matthews
- Richard Meighen
- William Ponsonby
- Humphrey Robinson
- John Smethwick
- Thomas Thorpe
- Thomas Walkley

== Publication ==
- Franciscus Gerardus Petrus Kellendonk: John & Richard Marriott. The history of a seventeenth-century publishing house. Amsterdam, 1978. (Dissertation Katholieke Universiteit Nijmegen). ISBN 90-253-5535-8
