= Humphrey Robinson =

English publisher and bookseller

Humphrey Robinson (died 13 November 1670) was a London publisher and bookseller of the middle seventeenth century.

Robinson was the son of a Bernard Robinson, a clerk from Carlisle; other members of his family were important clergymen and church office-holders. Humphrey Robinson became a "freeman" (a full member) of the Stationers Company on 30 June 1623. He was active as an independent bookseller in the years 1624–70. Based in his shop at the sign of the Three Pigeons in St. Paul's Churchyard, he was "one of the largest and most important booksellers of this period."

== With Moseley ==
Robinson is most noted for publishing two collections of plays in English Renaissance drama; he partnered in these works with colleague Humphrey Moseley. The most important of these collections was the first Beaumont and Fletcher folio of 1647; they also issued a significant collection of James Shirley's dramas titled Six New Plays in 1653. The two Humphreys also published a volume of the Duke of Newcastle's plays, and Sir William Davenant's Love and Honour, both in 1649. (After Moseley's death in 1661, Robinson worked with widow Anne Moseley when she continued her late husband's business; conjointly they published the 1661 edition of the Beaumont and Fletcher play Beggars' Bush.)

== And without ==
Operating without Moseley, Robinson published John Milton's masque Comus (1637), and Peter Hausted's scandalous play The Rival Friends (1645). Beyond the confines of the drama, Robinson published a range of works of various types, from the miscellaneous works of Sir Francis Bacon (1629) to Robert Norton's The Gunner (1664). Robinson may also have been involved in the private news service business that was a significant enterprise in his era; when newspapers were still in their infancy, many people relied on manuscript subscription news services for information. [See: Nathaniel Butter; John Pory.]

Robinson partnered with stationers other than Moseley on various projects. In one venture important in his own era, he was involved in the 1657 publication of Bishop Brian Walton's polyglot Bible. Robinson published an abundant supply of religious literature, as was standard for the booksellers of his period.

== Later career ==
Robinson served as a Warden of the Stationers Company in 1653, and as the guild's Master in both 1661 and 1667; in the later year, he was responsible for rebuilding the guildhall after the Great Fire of London (1666). In the mid-1650s, during the Commonwealth era, Robinson maintained an important correspondence with Joseph Williamson, who later became Secretary of State; their letters are preserved in the State Papers, and provide abundant data on the role Robinson played as a leading publisher of the period. (Williamson, at this early point in his career, regularly travelled to France as a tutor of young aristocrats; he simultaneously worked as Robinson's agent and business contact with French publishers.)

At his death he was survived by two children, a son, Humphrey, and a daughter, Grace. At the time of the father's death, the son was a fellow of All Souls' College, Oxford. Grace Robinson received two houses in St. Paul's Churchyard in her father's last will and testament. The stationer John Baker II leased the Three Pigeons shop from Robinson's heirs and continued the business to 1684.

== See also ==
- Robert Allot
- William Aspley
- Edward Blount
- Cuthbert Burby
- Walter Burre
- Philip Chetwinde
- Francis Constable
- Crooke and Cooke
- Richard Hawkins
- Henry Herringman
- William Jaggard
- Richard Meighen
- William Ponsonby
- John Smethwick
- Thomas Thorpe
