= Nicholas Okes =

English printer (died 1645)

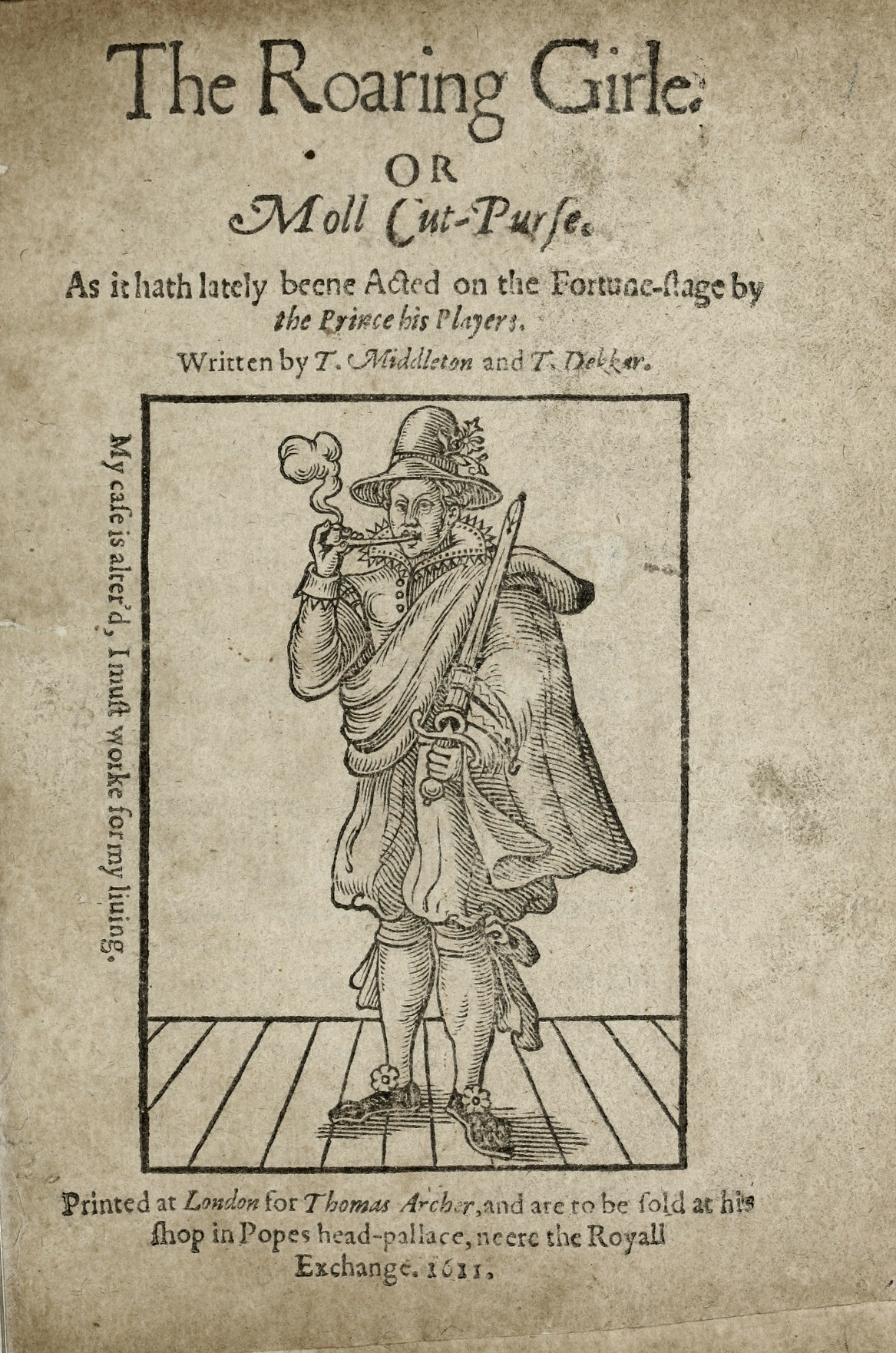
Title page of The Roaring Girle by Thomas Middleton and Thomas Dekker, printed by Nicholas Okes in 1611

Nicholas Okes (died 1645) was an English printer in London of the Jacobean and Caroline eras, remembered for printing works of English Renaissance drama. He was responsible for early editions of works by many of the playwrights of the period, including William Shakespeare, Ben Jonson, John Webster, Thomas Middleton, Thomas Dekker, Thomas Heywood, James Shirley, and John Ford.

== Life and work ==
Okes was the son of a "horner," a man who made hornbooks for the elementary education of small children; Okes's grandfather may have been a lute player. Nicholas Okes began his apprenticeship with printer Richard Field at Christmas 1595. He was made a "freeman" (full member) of the Stationers Company on 5 December 1603. His career advanced in 1606, in connection with the printing establishment of George and Lionel Snowden; Lionel left the firm and Okes took the man's place as George Snowden's partner (29 January 1606). Snowden, in turn, left the business on 13 April 1607, when Okes bought him out. Okes continued to use the Snowden's characteristic device, a winged horse above a caduceus (as on the title page of Lear, Q1) – though he later used an ornament of Jupiter riding an eagle between two oak trees.

The Snowden firm was long-standing, having been founded in 1586 by Thomas Judson; though at the start Okes possessed only a single press, two workmen, and a limited supply of type. Over time, however, Okes built a successful concern.

In February 1624, at St. Faith's in London, Okes married Mary Pursett, daughter of a fellow stationer, Christopher Pursett.

In a career that spanned more than three decades, Okes printed materials on a wide variety of subjects: history, literature, religion, science and mathematics, trade, travel, geography, cartography, even cookbooks. Yet his play texts have attracted the lion's share of attention from scholars, critics, and bibliographers.

== Shakespeare ==
One of Okes's earliest jobs was the printing of the fifth edition of Shakespeare's The Rape of Lucrece (1607) for the bookseller John Harrison (the fourth octavo edition, O4; often called, inaccurately, Q5). In the following year, 1608, Okes printed the famous and crucial first quarto of King Lear for Nathaniel Butter. Q1 of Lear was the first play (of many) printed by Okes; it has been argued that some of the peculiarities in that intensely studied volume resulted from the inexperience of Okes and his compositors with works of drama.

In 1622, Okes printed the first quarto of Othello for Thomas Walkley. Okes worked on several projects with Walkley in the years around 1622 – though he also took Walkley to court in a financial dispute. (This in itself was not unusual: Walkley struggled financially in his early years in business and was sued by other colleagues, too.)

In a more remote Shakespearean connection, Okes printed The Merry Conceited Jests of George Peele (1607) for Francis Faulkner and Henry Bell. This was a key source for The Puritan, one of the plays of the Shakespeare Apocrypha.

== And others ==
Okes printed a range of other texts in Jacobean and Caroline drama, beyond the confines of the Shakespeare canon. They include:

- Gervase Markham's The Dumb Knight (1608), for John Bache;
- Jonson's The Masque of Queens (1609), for Richard Bonian and Henry Walley;
- Dekker and Middleton's The Roaring Girl (1611), for Thomas Archer;
- Arthur Hopton's Speculum Topographicum, or The Topographicall Glassee (1611), for Simon Waterson;
- Webster's The White Devil (1612), also for Thomas Archer;
- Heywood's The Brazen Age (1613), for Samuel Rand;
- John Cooke's Greene's Tu Quoque (1614), for John Trundle;
- Thomas Tomkis's Albumazar (1615), for Walter Burre (plus two subsequent editions);
- the first two quartos of Beaumont and Fletcher's Philaster (1620, 1622), both for Walkley;
- Webster's The Duchess of Malfi (1623), for John Waterson;
- Shirley's The Wedding (1629), for John Grove;
- Ford's 'Tis Pity She's a Whore (1633), for Richard Collins;
- Heywood's A Maidenhead Well Lost (1634), for John Jackson and Francis Church;
- and some of the city entertainments of Thomas Dekker.

(In some cases, the line between bookseller/publisher and printer may not have been as clear-cut as in others. It is worth noting that Albumazar was entered into the Stationers' Register on 28 April 1615 – not by publisher Burre as would have been the norm, but by printer Okes; which suggests that Okes was more than just the printer hired for the job.)

The above list represents first editions. Okes also printed:

- the third, fourth, and sixth quartos of Dekker's The Honest Whore, Part 1 (1615, 1616, 1635), for Robert Basse (#3, #4) and Richard Collins (#6);
- the second and third editions of Tomkis's Lingua (1617, 1622), for Simon Waterson;
- the second and third editions of Francis Beaumont's The Knight of the Burning Pestle (both 1635) for John Smethwick;
- the collected edition of Samuel Daniel's plays (1623), for Simon Waterson.

Inevitably, Okes also printed works of many sorts that had nothing to do with the drama; these included religious works by John Donne and others – and also Thomas Cooper's The Mystery of Witchcraft (1617). He printed Robert Tofte's translation of Ariosto's Satires (1608) for Roger Jackson, and Gervase Markham's The English Arcadia (1613) for Thomas Saunders. Okes also printed Rachel Speght's A Muzzle for Melastomus (1617) for Thomas Archer – one of the few works authored by a woman printed in this period.

== Publishing ==
Like most printers of his historical period, Okes concentrated on printing, and left publishing decisions to the booksellers who commissioned jobs from him. And yet, again like most printers of the era, Okes did a limited amount of publishing himself. (Booksellers and printers were all members of the Stationers Company, and could publish books and other works; but the practicalities of the retail book business made booksellers the logical and primary publishers.) Okes's title pages identify his business as "near Holborn Bridge" and "in Foster Lane."

Okes published the first quartos of Heywood's Age quintet: The Golden Age (1611), The Silver Age (1613), The Brazen Age (1613) and his The Iron Age, Parts 1 and 2 (1632), as well as the first and second quarto of Heywood's The Four Prentices of London (1615, 1632). He published some of Heywood's non-dramatic prose, including his important An Apology for Actors (1612); in that volume, Heywood included an address "to his approved good friend, Nicholas Okes," that praises the printer's "care and workmanship" and calls him "careful and industrious" and "serious and laborious."

Okes also published the texts of some of the city entertainments common in the era, including several written by Thomas Middleton when he was City Chronologer of London, plus others by John Webster and Anthony Munday.

As with his printing, Okes published non-dramatic works as well as plays. One example is Samuel Daniel's The Collection of the History of England (1618); another is Robert Chamberlain's A New Book of Mistakes (1637). He published Anthony Munday's translation of Amadis de Gaul (1618–19), one of the chivalric romances that were enormously popular in the era. Okes published A Short Treatise on Magnetical Bodies and Motions (1613) by Mark Ridley, a follower of William Gilbert, and John Napier's A Description of the Admirable Table of Logarithms (1616).

Printers who published usually needed a retail outlet for their wares. The title page of Okes's edition of The Silver Age states that the book would be sold by Benjamin Lightfoote. Okes's edition of Richard Jobson's The Golden Trade (1623) was sold by Nicholas Bourne; his edition of Sir Thomas Overbury's translation of Ovid (1620) was sold by John Wells.

== Controversy ==
A number of printers and publishers of Okes's era got into trouble with the strict censorship policies of the Stuart regime, resulting in fines and occasional imprisonment. Nathaniel Butter, Okes's publisher for Lear, served time in jail for his professional activities. Okes was in difficulties throughout his career for printing works without official approval; when he printed George Wither's controversial Satires (1621) without registration, Okes ended up in jail himself. He was imprisoned again in 1637, for his second edition of Francis de Sales' Introduction to a Devout Life. Okes had altered the text after it was approved by the authorities, re-inserting Catholic phraseology.

The 1637 trouble was serious. Okes probably knew that the Star Chamber was planning to restrict the number of master printers to a total of twenty; and given his record, he knew that he would not be among those twenty. Okes wrote a letter to Archbishop Laud, offering to step aside from his business if his son John (see below) would be among the twenty master printers. His effort was futile; neither Okes was among the restricted group of masters. The Stuarts, however, were better at proclaiming laws than at enforcing them; and they were distracted by other aspects of the political turmoil leading up to the English Civil War. The Okes firm managed to stay in business "by indulgence."

At this historical remove, it is impossible to say whether Okes's choices over the problematic works he printed stemmed from economic motives, religious or political values, simple stubbornness, or a commitment to the earliest concepts of freedom of the press.

== Father and son ==
John Okes, son of Nicholas, served an apprenticeship under his father and became a freeman of the Stationers Company on 14 January 1627. For some years he was in partnership with his father; together they printed Heywood's The Royal King and the Loyal Subject (1637) for James Becket, and Richard Brathwaite's The Lives of All the Roman Emperors (1636) for George Hutton.

John Okes continued in business on his own after his father's retirement; he was situated in Little St. Bartholomew's near Smithfield. He printed James Shirley's The Grateful Servant (1637) for William Leake; and Richard Brome's The Sparagus Garden and The Antipodes for Francis Constable, and Thomas Nabbes's The Unfortunate Mother for Daniel Frere (all 1640). He printed and published William Rowley's play A Shoemaker a Gentleman (1638) and Jonson's masque The Gypsies Metamorphosed (1640). (Like his father, printer/publisher John Okes needed a retail outlet for his products; his edition of Rowley's play was sold by bookseller John Cooper.) The younger Okes continued in his father's role as a primary publisher of Heywood's non-dramatic prose.

John Okes died in 1644. His widow Mary continued his business, like some other stationers' widows did; but she does not appear to have succeeded or endured. For a brief historical moment, however, Mary Okes was at the center of attention of the English nation – when she testified about the Introduction to a Devout Life matter at the 1644 trial of Archbishop Laud.
