= The Faithful Shepherdess =

Stage play by John Fletcher

The Faithful Shepherdess is a Jacobean era stage play, the work that inaugurated the playwriting career of John Fletcher. Though the initial production was a failure with its audience, the printed text that followed proved significant, in that it contained Fletcher's influential definition of tragicomedy. Like many of Fletcher's later tragicomedies, The Faithful Shepherdess deals with the darker side of sexuality and sexual jealousy, albeit within a comic framework.

== Plot summary ==
The play's eponymous heroine is Clorin, a virgin shepherdess who values chastity and devotion above all. A skilled healer, Clorin has chosen to live in solitude near the grave of her first love. During the course of the play, various couples will find themselves thrown into erotic turmoil, and it is Clorin who heals them and facilitates their reconciliation.

In the first storyline, the shepherd Perigot and the shepherdess Amoret are in love, though their love is unconsummated and pure. The shepherdess Amarillis, however, is also in love with Perigot, and plots to undermine the happy couple. Amarillis enlists the help of the Sullen Shepherd, a libertine villain willing to go to any lengths to obtain his desires or to break the "plighted troths of mutual souls." With the help of a magic fountain, Amarillis takes on the likeness of Amoret. The disguised Amarillis makes advances on Perigot, convincing him that his Amoret is unchaste. Bitterly disappointed in his love, Perigot stabs the real Amoret. He leaves her to die, and the Sullen Shepherd throws her body into the river, but Amoret is saved by the intervention of the river god. Amarillis later confesses her deception to Perigot, but this only leads to further confusion: when the healed Amoret tries to reconcile with Perigot, he believes her to be Amarillis in disguise, and stabs her a second time. A Satyr finds the hurt Amoret and brings her to Clorin to be healed. Meanwhile, Perigot cannot wash Amoret's blood off his hands. Perigot seeks Clorin's help, but even her holy water cannot cleanse him, since his hands are stained with the blood of an innocent maiden. Perigot sees Amoret and begs forgiveness; Amoret pardons him, and his hands become clean.

In the second storyline, the lustful shepherdess Cloe is seeking a lover. Any lover will do; as she declares, "It is impossible to ravish me, I am so willing". She first tries to seduce the modest shepherd Daphnis, but finds him too restrained for her taste. She then turns to the shepherd Alexis, who is eager to comply. They meet at night for their tryst, but are spied upon by the Sullen Shepherd, who suddenly lusts after Cloe himself. The Sullen Shepherd attacks Alexis, and Cloe runs off. The Satyr brings the wounded Alexis to Clorin's cabin. Clorin heals Alexis, and teaches him to abandon his lust. Cloe is also brought before Clorin, and purged of her unruly desire.

In yet another storyline, the shepherd Thenot is in love with Clorin. Since what Thenot admires most is Clorin's constancy to her dead lover, he woos her all the while hoping he will fail in his pursuit. Clorin eventually cures Thenot of his impossible love by pretending to fall in love with him. Repulsed, Thenot loses all desire for Clorin and flees.

By the play's end, Amarillis and the Sullen Shepherd are caught and brought before Clorin. Their crimes are made known and the Sullen Shepherd is banished, but Amarillis repents and is pardoned. Perigot and Amoret, as well as Cloe and Alexis, promise to love faithfully and chastely from now on.

== Performance ==
The play was premiered onstage most likely in 1608, acted probably by the Children of the Blackfriars, one of the troupes of boy actors popular at the time. The King's Men later obtained the rights to the play, and acted it at Somerset House before King Charles I and Queen Henrietta Maria on Twelfth Night, 6 January 1634. (The production utilized the sumptuous costumes left over from the 1633 masque The Shepherd's Paradise, which Henrietta Maria then donated to the actors.) The King's Men also performed the play in their normal venue, the Blackfriars Theatre.

== Publication ==
The Faithful Shepherdess was first published soon after its stage premier, in a quarto issued by the booksellers Richard Bonian and Henry Walley; though the first edition is undated, it almost certainly appeared in 1609. (The partnership of Bonian and Walley is traceable only from late December 1608 to mid-January 1610.)

The first edition contained commendatory poems by Ben Jonson, George Chapman, Francis Beaumont, and Nathan Field, and dedications by Fletcher to Sir Walter Aston, Sir Robert Townshend, and Sir William Skipwith. It also provided Fletcher's famous and often-quoted address "To the Reader," which includes his definition of tragicomedy. Fletcher states that the original audience, unfamiliar with the term and concept of tragicomedy, expected a play with characters "sometimes laughing together, and sometimes killing each other." For Fletcher, in contrast, "A tragicomedy is not so called in respect of mirth and killing, but in respect it wants deaths, which is enough to make it no tragedy, yet brings some near it, which is enough to make it no comedy...."

An entry in the Stationers' Register shows that Walley transferred his rights to the play to stationer Richard Meighen on 8 December 1629. Meighen issued a second edition in 1629. Meighen capitalized on the 1634 revival by issuing a third quarto of the text in that year (printed by Augustine Matthews); subsequent editions followed in 1656 and 1665. The play was also included in the second Beaumont and Fletcher folio of 1679.

== Genre ==
Fletcher described his play as a "pastoral tragicomedy." It was not the first English drama of its type in its time: Daniel's The Queen's Arcadia, also labelled a "pastoral tragicomedy," dates from 1605.

Fletcher exploits the traditional elements of pastoral form in his play, which is set in Thessaly and includes characters named Amaryllis (from the Eclogues of Virgil) and Daphnis and Cloe (from the novel of that name by Longus); one of the characters is a satyr. Critics have seen in the play the influence of Renaissance works like Guarini's Il Pastor Fido (1590) and Antonio Marsi's Mirzia. The play "represents an attempt to integrate Italianate pastoral with the English tradition exemplified by the Spenserians, drawing on both versions of pastoral in ways in which each is complicated and ironised."

The heroine of the play is the shepherdess Clorin; her love has died, yet she remains loyal to his memory and retains her chastity. This point illustrates the essential flaw and limitation of the play: little actually happens in it. "Fletcher glorifies chaste womanhood in a Spenser-like faery atmosphere...The play is an esthetic, not a moral failure, with lack of plot as its basic fault."

Fletcher would learn from his mistake; the tragicomedies he would later write, on his own and with Beaumont, Philip Massinger, and other collaborators, tend to be rich with (perhaps, in some cases, over-supplied with) variegated action.
