= Thomas Walkley =

Thomas Walkley (fl. 1618 – 1658) was a London publisher and bookseller in the early and middle seventeenth century. He is noted for publishing a range of significant texts in English Renaissance drama, "and much other interesting literature."

== Career ==
Walkley became a "freedman" (a full member) of the Stationers Company on 19 January 1618 (all dates new style). His shop was located first at the sign of the Eagle and Child in Britain's Burse, until about 1630; later at the sign of the Flying Horse near York House; and finally at the sign of the Golden Mortar and Pestle between York House and Charring Cross. Walkley struggled financially in his early years, and had trouble paying his printers; but his fortunes improved by the later 1620s, as he benefitted from important political contacts. Yet political fortunes shifted in the turbulent century: in 1649 Walkley got into trouble with the Commonwealth government, which issued a warrant against him for dispensing royalist material from the sons of the late King Charles I, then on the island of Jersey. He was vigorously active in publishing for nearly three decades, though his output slackened after 1645.

== Drama ==
In drama, Walkley's most important volume was the 1622 first quarto of Othello, printed for him by Nicholas Okes. The book provided a "good text" of the play, and was the only early Shakespearean quarto that divided its play into five Acts.

In addition, Walkley issued other key editions of plays and masques, including —

- the first two quartos of Beaumont and Fletcher's A King and No King (1619, 1625);
- the first two quartos of Beaumont and Fletcher's Philaster (1620, 1622);
- the first quarto of Beaumont and Fletcher's Thierry and Theodoret (1621);
- Philip Massinger's The Picture (1630);
- both of Ben Jonson's 1631 masques, Love's Triumph Through Callipolis and Chloridia;
- Thomas Carew's masque Cœlum Britanicum (1634);
- Sir William Davenant's 1634 masque The Temple of Love;
- Sir John Suckling's Aglaura (1638);
- Davenant's 1638 masque Luminalia;
- Davenant's 1639 masque Britannia Triumphans;
- Davenant's Salmacida Spolia (1640), the final royal masque of the early Stuart era.

Walkley wrote prefaces to Othello and A King and No King. The plays Walkley published from 1619 to 1630 were exclusively the property of the King's Men, indicating an apparent working relationship between the stationer and the acting company. (Walkley's fellow stationer Francis Constable appears to have had a similar relationship with the King's Men in the same era.) Scholars have studied the 1622 quarto of Othello by comparing it to the other King's Men play quartos issued by Walkley.

Walkley also released the first English translation of Pierre Corneille's Le Cid in 1638, just a year after its first French printing.

== Other works ==
Beyond the confines of drama, Walkley was active in the area of non-dramatic poetry. He published —

- George Wither's Fidelia (1619);
- Wither'sWorks (1620);
- John Barclay's The Mirror of Minds (1638);
- Thomas Carew's Poems (1640, 1642);
- Cooper's Hill (1642), the best-known work of Sir John Denham;
- Edmund Waller's Poems (1645).

He also issued a volume titled Britain's Ida, or Venus and Anchises (1628) as the work of Edmund Spenser; it is definitely not Spenserian, and has been attributed to Phineas Fletcher.

Walkley published translations by Thomas May, along with pamphlets, Parliamentary speeches, legal documents, and a varied body of general literature, from Aesop's Fables to a history of the Roman Emperor Nero. He was also the publisher for works by the royal favorite George Villiers, 1st Duke of Buckingham, a fact crucial in his later prosperity. Walkley's entire output for the year 1627 was devoted to Buckingham's cause. That powerful connection gained Walkley the rights to the Parliamentary List and the Catalogue of Nobility, two highly profitable publications that Walkley released in multiple editions over many years (seventeen and fourteen editions, respectively, from 1625 on).

== Reputation ==
Walkley was involved in lawsuits and controversies during his career — including one over the rights to some of the works of Ben Jonson that eventually appeared in the second Jonson folio of 1640. One critic has called Walkley a "fascinating rogue." Yet legal troubles and even spells in prison were not unusual for the stationers of the Tudor and Stuart eras. (See Edward Allde, Nathaniel Butter, Nicholas Okes, and William Stansby for pertinent examples.) Walkley does not appear to have been worse (or better) than many of his contemporaries.

== See also ==
- Walter Burre
- Andrew Crooke and William Cooke
- John and Richard Marriot
- John Martyn
- Humphrey Moseley
- Humphrey Robinson
- William Ponsonby
