= Augustine Matthews =

English publisher and printer (fl. 1615–1637)

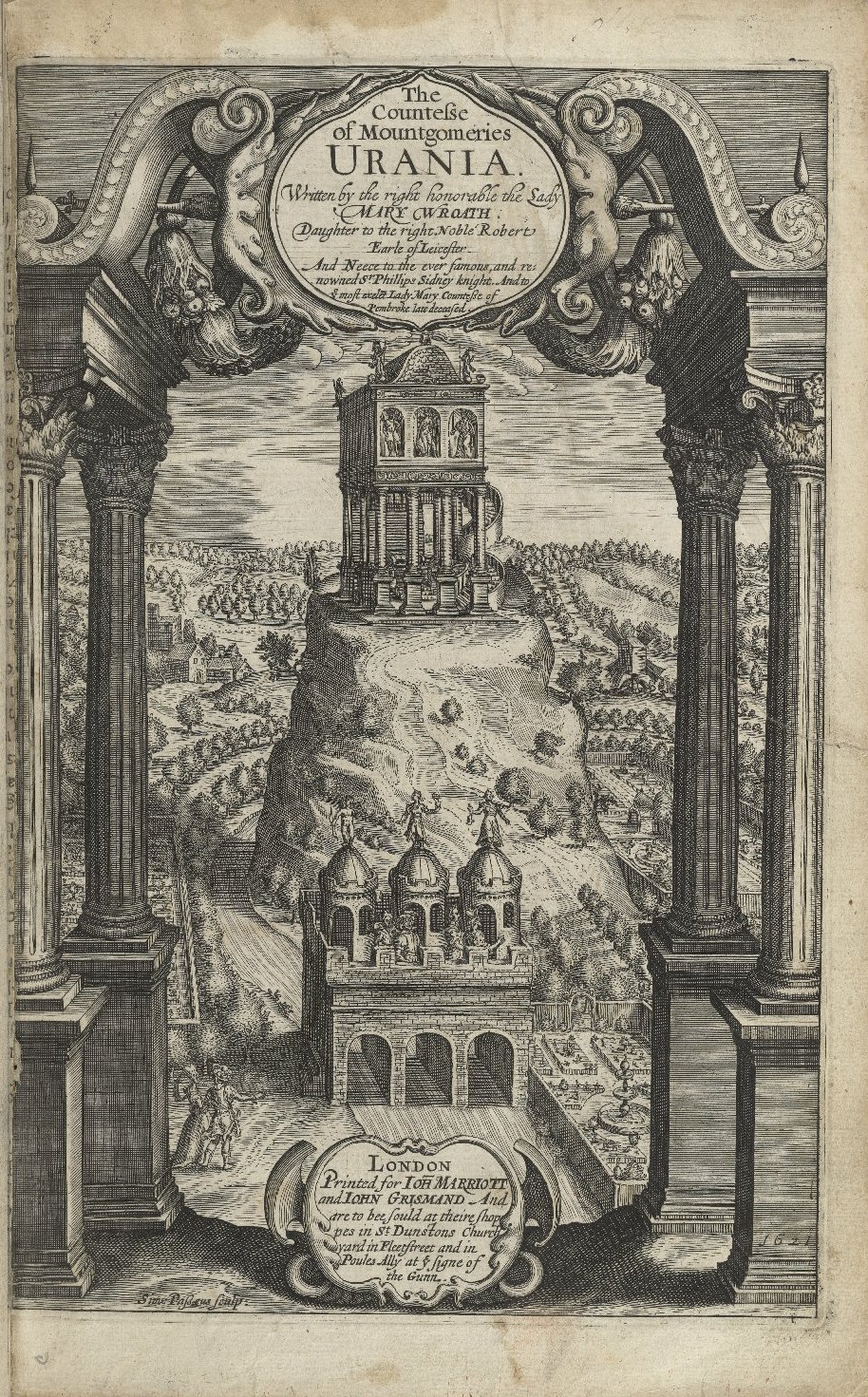
The title page of Lady Mary Wroth's The Countesse of Mountgomeries Urania, 1621, printed by Augustine Matthews

Augustine Matthews (fl. 1615 – 1637) was a printer in London in the Jacobean and Caroline eras. Among a wide variety of other work, Matthews printed notable texts in English Renaissance drama.

Matthews became a freedman (a full member) of the Stationers Company on 9 May 1615. By 1619 he was established in his own business (in Cow Lane), and for the next two decades he produced a range of literature for many of the booksellers of his generation.

In the field of drama, Matthews printed these editions of these plays:

- Q2 of Thomas Middleton and William Rowley's A Fair Quarrel, 1622
- Q3 of The Troublesome Reign of King John, 1622
- Q1 of John Webster's The Devil's Law Case, 1623
- Q1 of the anonymous Tragedy of Nero, 1624 (with printer John Norton)
- Q2 of Beaumont and Fletcher's The Scornful Lady, 1625
  - Q4 of the same play, 1635
- Q3 of Beaumont and Fletcher's Philaster, 1628
- Q3 of George Wilkins's The Miseries of Enforced Marriage, 1629
- Q2 of William Shakespeare's Othello, 1630
- Q1 of Philip Massinger's The Renegado, 1630
- Q1 of Sir William Davenant's The Cruel Brother, 1630
- Q1 of Thomas Drue's The Duchess of Suffolk, 1631
- Q3 of Beaumont and Fletcher's A King and No King, 1631
- Q3 of William Haughton's Englishmen for My Money, 1631
- Q1 of Richard Brome's The Northern Lass, 1632
- Q1 of the anonymous The Costly Whore, 1633
- Q1 of Thomas May's The Heir, 1633
- Q1 of Shackerley Marmion's A Fine Companion, 1633
- Q3 of John Fletcher's The Faithful Shepherdess, 1634.

In the standard practice in his era, Matthews the printer generally worked for booksellers functioning as publishers. Matthews printed the second quarto of Othello for stationer Richard Hawkins; he printed the 1622 third edition of The Troublesome Reign for Thomas Dewes – a controversial text, since its title page attributed that play to Shakespeare. The 1635 fourth edition of The Scornful Lady was a rare instance in which Matthews acted as both printer and publisher.

Printers in Matthews's era were sometimes identified by name, sometimes by initials, and sometimes not at all. Bibliographers have worked to assign responsibility for specific texts to specific printers. Matthews is thought to have been one of the London printers, along with Edward Allde and Nicholas Okes, who produced the early quartos of Middleton's A Game at Chess.

Matthews printed a wide range of work beyond the confines of drama. He was an important printer of the works of John Donne, and printed some of the work of the poet George Wither. In 1621 he printed the first edition of Lady Mary Wroth's controversial Urania for John Marriot and John Grismand. (The project was a rush job; the text ends in the middle of a sentence.) He also printed items in the religious literature that was so abundant in the early seventeenth century. Two examples: Matthews printed a pair of collections of Thomas Adams's sermons, The Soldier's Honour (1629) and Erienopolis, the City of Peace (1630), both for John Grismand.

As was common for printers and booksellers of his historical period, Matthews had recurring problems with the authorities. In 1629, he, Nathaniel Butter, and two others were accused of publishing unlicensed books. At other times in his career, Matthews got into trouble for running too many presses, and for having too many apprentices.
