= The Grateful Servant =

Caroline era stage play by James Shirley

The Grateful Servant is a Caroline era stage play, a tragicomedy written by James Shirley, and first published in 1630. Its publication marked a significant development in Shirley's evolving literary career.

The play was licensed for performance by Sir Henry Herbert, the Master of the Revels, on 3 November 1629, under the title The Faithful Servant. It was acted by Queen Henrietta's Men at the Cockpit Theatre, as were most of Shirley's plays in this era.

== Publication ==
The play was entered into the Stationers' Register on 26 February 1630 and published in quarto later that year by the bookseller John Grove. Shirley dedicated the play to Francis Manners, 6th Earl of Rutland. The 1630 quarto is noteworthy in that the play's text is preceded by eleven commendatory poems from contemporary literary men, including Philip Massinger, Thomas May, and Thomas Randolph – showing that Shirley, who had been writing professionally for only about four years at that time, was rapidly becoming recognized as a significant figure on the literary scene. The play was reprinted in 1637, in a quarto printed by John Okes for William Leake. A third edition followed in 1655, also from Leake.

== In the Restoration ==
The play was revived in the Restoration era; a popular actress called Mrs. Long had a major success in the "breeches part" of Dulcino in 1666, and made the revival production "as beneficial to the company as several new plays." Samuel Pepys saw a performance of the play on 20 February 1669, as recorded in his Diary.

== Synopsis ==
The Duke of Savoy was betrothed to Princess Leonora of Milan – but the current Milanese ruler has reneged on the commitment. The indignant Duke decides to court a local gentlewoman named Cleona instead. Foscari, Cleona's former betrothed, is believed dead; but he suddenly shows up in the Savoyard capital quite alive, and accompanied by a handsome young page called Dulcino, whom Foscari rescued from bandits. Foscari, unaware of the Duke's interest in Cleona, sends Dulcino to her to announce his arrival; the Duke meets Dulcino there, and is powerfully struck by the page's resemblance to Leonora. Cleona, for her part, is faithful to Foscari and pleased to learn he's alive and well.

Foscari, however, through an exaggerated sense of loyalty, resolves to resign his interest in Cleona to the Duke and decides to become a Benedictine monk. He informs the surprised Duke of his decision, and sends Dulcino to tell Cleona that the news that Foscari is alive is actually false. Foscari even convinces a hesitant Dulcino to join the Benedictine order along with him. A monk named Valentio arrives to arrange their admission – but Valentio instantly greets Dulcino as "dear Leonora." Valentio reveals that Leonora had fled the Milanese court when her father died, for she feared being forced to marry her uncle. She disguised herself as a page and came to Savoy, with Valentio as her companion and chaperon, to see if the Duke would honor their previous commitment. Two weddings, of the Duke and Leonora and of Foscari and Cleona, determine the happy ending.

As usual in Shirley's drama, this main plot is supported by secondary material. The Duke has a libertine brother, Lodwick; at the start of the play his wife Astella has left him and is staying with Cleona. Lodwick commands his follower Piero to commit adultery with Astella, so that Lodwick can divorce her. Lodwick's old tutor, Lord Grimuldo, tries to persuade his former student to repent; failing this, Grimuldo pretends to have been testing Lodwick and to be, in reality, a fellow libertine. Grimuldo offers to introduce Lodwick to a superior mistress, and brings him to a lush garden filled with strange music, where they watch a masque of nymphs and satyrs. The woman Lodwick meets there is enticing but disturbing; she hints that she has unusual powers, and offers him unlimited dominion – and finally concedes that she is a devil, a succubus.

A deeply upset Lodwick flees homeward, only to find Piero with Astella. Piero tells his master that he has fulfilled his command, and expects reward; Lodwick tries to kill him, forcing Piero to admit that Astella has not submitted to him. The chastened and reformed Lodwick decides to renew his vows with Astella, making them a third matrimonial couple at the play's end. Lodwick also demands punishment for the "libertine" Grimuldo – but the devil-woman turns out to have been Grimuldo's wife Belinda; the ruse is exposed.

Comic relief is provided by Jacomo, Cleona's steward; ambitious but foolish, he resembles Malvolio in Shakespeare's Twelfth Night. The plot device of a courtier trying to get another man to sleep with his wife so he can divorce her is re-used by Shirley in his next play, The Humorous Courtier.

== Sources ==
- Clark, Ira. Professional Playwrights: Massinger, Ford, Shirley, and Brome. Lexington, KY, University Press of Kentucky, 1992.
- Forsythe, Robert Stanley. The Relations of Shirley's Plays to the Elizabethan Drama. New York, Columbia University Press, 1914.
- Nason, Arthur Huntington. James Shirley, Dramatist: A Biographical and Critical Study. New York, 1915; reprinted New York, Benjamin Blom, 1967.
