= Humphrey Moseley =

English publisher and bookseller

Humphrey Moseley (died 31 January 1661) was a prominent London publisher and bookseller in the middle seventeenth century.

== Life ==
Possibly a son of publisher Samuel Moseley, Humphrey Moseley became a "freeman" (a full member) of the Stationers Company, the guild of London booksellers, on 7 May 1627; he was selected a Warden of the company on 7 July 1659. His shop was located at the sign of the Prince's Arms in St Paul's Churchyard. One of the most productive publishers of his era, Moseley's imprint exists on 314 surviving books.

== Drama and poetry ==
Moseley is best known for the first Beaumont and Fletcher folio of 1647, which he published in partnership with stationer Humphrey Robinson. Moseley partnered with Robinson on other projects too, and also with Nicholas Fussell (to 1635) and Francis Constable. Moseley issued a range of important Jacobean and Caroline playwrights, including Thomas Middleton, Philip Massinger, James Shirley, Richard Brome, and Sir William D'Avenant. In the Commonwealth era Moseley dominated the publication of drama: "the plays brought out by him far outnumbered those of any other publisher."

In the 1640s and 1650s Moseley dominated the market for English poetry, issuing a series of single-poet collections—most prominently John Milton (Poems, 1645), but also John Donne, Edmund Waller, Richard Crashaw, Abraham Cowley, Henry Vaughan, and Sir John Suckling. In terms of the Cavalier–Roundhead conflict that dominated their generation, the poets and playwrights published by Moseley were, in the main, Royalist sympathizers—almost inevitably, since the Puritans were generally hostile to drama and imaginative literature, and closed the theatres during their rule. Moseley was known to have Royalist sympathies himself—which makes his role as publisher to the Puritan Milton surprising.

Moseley collected a large body of dramatic manuscripts during the years the theatres were closed during the Puritan regime (1642–60), with the likely intent of future publication. Any such plans were forestalled by his untimely death at the very beginning of the Restoration. Part of his collection of playscripts eventually found its way into the possession of antiquarian John Warburton, only to be consumed in the notorious kitchen burnings, in which Warburton's cook used the manuscripts as scrap paper.

== Other works ==
Moseley published works by alchemists, including Robert Fludd; he also published Sir Francis Bacon, and the music of René Descartes. And he printed a wide variety of general-interest works – Thomas Barker's The Art of Angling (1659) being only one example. He also engaged in the then-new practice of cataloguing his works – though he did not go as far as some of his contemporaries did, and try to catalogue an entire field of publishing. Moseley included a catalogue of 135 of his publications in his 1653 edition of Five New Plays by Richard Brome, and another catalogue of 180 Moseley products in his 1654 edition of Sir Aston Cockayne's Dianea.

== Shakespeare ==
Moseley has earned the respect and praise of bibliographers and collectors for the quality and selection of his output. He is also a footnote in Shakespeare studies, due to two sets of entries Moseley made in the Register of the Stationers Company that touch upon Shakespeare. (Such registrations were claims to the rights to publish a given work, and had to precede any legal publication.) On 9 September 1653, Moseley registered the play Cardenio as the work of William Shakespeare and John Fletcher, and plays titled Henry I and Henry II as the work of Shakespeare and Robert Davenport. On 29 June 1660, he registered three plays, The History of King Stephen, Duke Humphrey, a Tragedy, and Iphis and Iantha, or A Marriage Without a Man, a Comedy (a treatment of Ovid's story of Iphis and Ianthe) – all allegedly by Shakespeare. Scholars have generally rejected the idea of such plays as Shakespearean works, but now the Cardenio attribution and the supposed derived work Double Falshood have been given some standing.

== Post mortem ==
Moseley's last will and testament named his "dear and loving wife" Anne Moseley and his "dutiful child and only daughter," also named Anne, as his executrices. They carried on the business after his death. (Two of Moseley's workers, Henry Penton and John Langford, received bequests of £5 each in the will – provided they continued to work for the firm.) When the widow Moseley eventually liquidated the business, many of the Moseley copyrights were purchased by Henry Herringman, Humphrey Moseley's successor as the dominant publisher of his generation.

== See also ==
- Robert Allot
- William Aspley
- Edward Blount
- Philip Chetwinde
- Thomas Cotes
- Crooke and Cooke
- Richard Field
- Richard Hawkins
- William Jaggard
- Richard Meighen
- John Smethwick
