= A Mad World, My Masters =

Play by Thomas Middleton

A Mad World, My Masters is a Jacobean stage play written by Thomas Middleton, a comedy first performed around 1605 and first published in 1608. The title had been used by a pamphleteer, Nicholas Breton, in 1603, and was later the origin for the title of Stanley Kramer's 1963 film, It's a Mad, Mad, Mad, Mad World.

The play was entered into the Stationers' Register on 4 October 1608, and first published in quarto later that year by the bookseller Walter Burre. In the play's final two Acts in the 1608 text, some characters have different names than in the prior three Acts (Penitent Brothel is Penitent Once-Ill; Harebrain is Hargrave, or Shortrod)—which suggests that the extant text is a revised version. A second quarto appeared in 1640, issued by the bookseller James Becket; the title page of Q2 states that the play had been "often acted" by Queen Henrietta's Men at the Salisbury Court Theatre. The play was revived at least twice in the Restoration era (1661–2), and was adapted for other productions in the later 18th century.

== Genre ==
The play belongs to the special subgenre known as city comedy; it provides a satirical and rather cynical view of life, as an amoral and fairly ruthless battle of wits in the urban metropolis of early 17th-century London. It was premiered sometime around the middle of the first decade of the century by the Children of Paul's, a company of boy actors popular at the time—a troupe that tended to specialise in a drama for an elite audience of gentlemen rather than the more broad-based theatre of the large public playhouses like the Globe or Fortune Theatres.

Middleton likely drew upon a wide range of contemporary literature for the play's plot and atmosphere, including a chapbook titled The Merry Conceited Jests of George Peele that was registered in 1605. The play is generally considered one of the best of the satirical city comedies that Middleton wrote in the early 17th century, along with A Trick to Catch the Old One. It has been praised for having "the most skillfully constructed plot" of any of the playwright's London comedies, and also for its liveliness and its "details of local color."

== Characters ==
- Sir Bounteous Progress, an old rich country knight
- Gunwater, steward to Sir Bounteous
- Richard Follywit, grandson to Sir Bounteous
- Lieutenant Mawworm & Ancient Hoboy, Follywit's cohorts
- Another cohort disguised as a Footman
- Other Comrades to Follywit
- Master Shortrod Harebrain, a jealous husband
- Wife to Master Harebrain
- Rafe, servant to Master Harebrain
- Master Penitent Brothel, in love with Harebrain's Wife
- Jasper, servant to Master Penitent
- Courtesan, mistress to Sir Bounteous, bawd to Master Penitent
- Mother to the Courtesan, an old gentlewoman, bawd to her daughter
- Man, servant to the Courtesan
- Master Inesse & Master Possibility, two eldest brothers and heirs, suitors to the Courtesan
- Two Knights, visitors to Sir Bounteous
- Constable
- Two or three Watchmen, hired by Master Harebrain
- Servants to Sir Bounteous
- Neighbours to Sir Bounteous
- Succubus, a devil in the likeness of Harebrain's Wife

== Synopsis ==
=== Act I ===
Scene 1: A London street

Richard Follywit enters with his cohorts, Mawworm (intestinal worm), Hoboy, and other hangers-on. He jokes with his companions about their wild ways and sarcastically repents and says he is now a man who "swears without number, gulls without mercy and drinks without measure." He tells his cohorts of a plan he has hatched to get some more money: His grandfather, Sir Bounteous Progress (a rich old knight) has left him everything in his will, but refuses to give him as much as ten pounds while he is still alive. Despite his frugality concerning Follywit, Bounteous loves to entertain noble guests with extravagant feasts. Follywit therefore plans to disguise himself as a great lord so that he can capitalize on his grandfather's hospitality.

As Follywit & co. exit, Penitent Brothel, a country gentleman, enters. Penitent remarks on Follywit's reputation as a wild prankster, but notes that he is not so much better because he is subject to "wild passions and deadly follies himself": he is in love Mistress Hairbrain, who is extremely difficult to get to because she is kept under strict guard by her obsessively jealous husband, Mr. Hairbrain. In order to get to Mistress Hairbrain, Penitent says he has contracted the services of 'The Courtesan', a prostitute who poses as Mistress Hairbrain's friend and moral instructor but is in fact working to corrupt her.

The Courtesan enters and tells Penitent that Mistress Hairbrain's corruption is going very well; the only problem is Mr. Hairbrain, whose excessive jealously is likely to make the project very difficult. Penitent frets, but the Courtesan tells him not to worry: she won't take any money unless the project is a success. Penitent praises the Courtesan's business ethic and exits.

The Courtesan's Mother brings the Courtesan a token from Sir Bounteous Progress (the Courtesan is Sir Bounteous Progress' mistress). Luxuriating in the subtlety of her own craftiness, the Mother tells how she has prostituted the Courtesan fifteen times in order to save up enough money for a good marriage dowry. She tells the Courtesan it is all worthwhile if, by sinning, she can secure a good name for herself: "Who gets the opinion of a virtuous name, / May sin at pleasure and never think of shame." The Courtesan exits.

Inesse and Possibility enter. They are the eldest brothers from two different families; the former holds his lands "in esse" (in actual possession), and the latter holds his lands "in posse" (in anticipated possession)—either of these men could be a prime source of revenue for the Courtesan. Inesse and Possibility ask the Mother where the Courtesan is; the Mother tells them she is studying the Bible. They ask if they can see her. The Mother says she will only grant permission after they have sworn to refrain from using coarse language.

Scene 2: A room in Hairbrain's house in London

Obsessing over the possibility that his wife might cheat on him, Harebrain hires two watchmen to guard his house, telling them that he has heard a rumor that he might be robbed; in an aside, he reveals that the 'jewel' he really intends to guard is his wife. The Courtesan enters (posing, as Mistress Hairbrain's friend and moral instructor). Hairbrain tells her that he is very worried about his wife's chastity, and mentions that he has taken away all of her erotic literature (which includes Shakespeare's narrative poem, Venus and Adonis). He asks the Courtesan to read some religious literature to Mistress Hairbrain: "There's a good chapter on Hell that will terrify her in this cold weather. So read to her the horrible punishments for itching wantonness." The Courtesan exits. Talking to himself, Hairbrain says that, with the help of the Courtesan, he will keep his wife honest, only performing sexual favors for her husband (he regards sex as the payment she owes him for room and board).

Mistress Hairbrain and the Courtesan enter. The Courtesan instructs Mistress Hairbrain in the art of appearing chaste and avoiding any traps her husband might set for her. Mistress Hairbrain gives the Courtesan a jewel to present to Penitent Brothel as a promise of her love, which she says she will demonstrate as soon as she manages to escape from her husband's strict guard. When Hairbrain joins them, the Courtesan tells him that Mistress Hairbrain believes that every sin is damnable—an opinion that the Courtesan has been trying to refute. Hairbrain laughs at his wife's alleged moral strictness. He says that sins such as usury, bribery, sloth, pride and gluttony are permissible—the only truly damnable sin is adultery. When the Courtesan exits, Hairbrain orders his wife to follow her instructor's advice faithfully.

=== Act II ===
Scene 1: Sir Bounteous' home outside London

Sir Bounteous bids farewell to a pair of visiting noblemen who thank him for his generous hospitality. Follywit enters, disguised as 'Lord Owemuch' and accompanied by his cohorts, who are disguised as servants. Sir Bounteous greets 'Owemuch' warmly. After a bit of small talk, he asks him if he would give his nephew (Follywit) a job, noting that he has left his entire estate to Follywit in his will (a 'secret' that he mistakenly believes Follywit is unaware of). 'Owemuch' says that he has heard many good things about Follywit and agrees to take him under his wing.

Scene 2: A London street

Bounteous leads 'Owemuch' to his lodgings for the night, promising first-rate luxury in everything. As soon as Bounteous leaves, Follywit and his cohorts change into other costumes (masquing suits, which include masks to cover their faces).

Scene 3: A room in the Courtesan's house, London

The Courtesan sends a servant to tell Penitent Brothel that she has hatched a plan to make Mistress Hairbrain his.

Scene 4: Sir Bounteous' home

Disguised in their masquing outfits, Follywit and his cohorts tie up Bounteous' servants and proceed to rob the place. Bounteous seems most worried that his guest, 'Owemuch' might be disturbed by the robbery. Follywit tells him that they have tied 'Owemuch' up and left him in his room. After Bounteous is carried off, Follywit orders his cohorts to hide the loot in his suitcase, change out of their masquing outfits and tie each other up so it will look like they have been assailed by the robbers as well.

Scene 5: A room in the Courtesan's house, London

The Courtesan tells Penitent of her plan to help him seduce Mistress Hairbrain: She will pretend to be violently ill (an act, she says, that comes naturally to women), and beg Hairbrain to allow his wife to visit her. When Mistress Hairbrain visits, Penitent can pose as her doctor, and thus sneak off with Mistress Hairbrain to an adjoining room while the 'visit' is supposedly taking place. The Courtesan says that her plan will be profitable as well because the two elder brothers Innes and Possibility will undoubtedly visit to enquire about her health; disguised as a doctor, Penitent will be in a perfect position to squeeze cash for 'medicine' out of them.

Scene 6: Follywit's bedchamber in Sir Bounteous' house

One of Follywit's cohorts (disguised as 'Owemuch's' servant) unties Bounteous, who is primarily concerned for 'Owemuch's' welfare. 'Owemuch' (Follywit) enters. Bounteous asks 'Owemuch' what the thieves took from him. Feigning gentlemanly bravado, 'Owemuch' insists that they robbed him of nothing other than a good night's sleep. Believing that 'Owemuch' is merely trying to be honorable, Bounteous asks his 'servant' (actually Mawworm) what the thieves got from him. The 'servant' 'reluctantly' tells him that the thieves got away with nearly two hundred pounds worth of valuables. Bounteous gives the 'servant' money to replace the stolen goods, but tells him to keep it a secret from 'Owemuch'.

=== Act III ===
Scene 1: A room in Hairbrain's house in London

Possibility and Innes call at Hairbrain's house. Jealous as usual, Hairbrain plans to watch how his wife reacts to the presence of the two young gentlemen. He calls her down to greet them.

Hairbrain tells Innes and Possibility about the Courtesan's sudden illness. He says that he has been to visit her, and was especially touched to hear her bequeath a jewel to his wife as she dictated her will.

Hairbrain's servant enters and says that Mistress Hairbrain apologizes because she cannot appear because she is feeling ill. Possibility and Innes exit. As soon as they are gone, the servant tells Hairbrain that his wife is, in fact fine—she pretended to be ill because she was too modest to appear before the two brothers. This great show of modesty causes Hairbrain to reconsider his excessive jealousy.

Scene 2: The Courtesan's bedchamber

Sir Bounteous arrives at the Courtesans's home for a 'visit'. Penitent, disguised as a doctor, tells him that she is ill. When he sees her, Bounteous worries that she is ill because he has impregnated her. Feeling guilty (but congratulating himself on being potent despite his advanced age), he gives the 'doctor' money for expensive medicines and leaves.

Innes and Possibility enter. The 'doctor' cons money for medicine out of them, too. News comes of Mistress Hairbrain's impending arrival. Worried that they will ruin his plans, Penitent does his best to get rid of the brothers, but they refuse to leave until the Courtesan pretends that she needs the 'doctor's' help to urinate in a bedpan—a ruse that precipitates the brothers' speedy exit. Penitent praises the Courtesan's ingenuity. Mistress Hairbrain enters and immediately retires to an adjoining room to have sex with Penitent. Hairbrain listens at the Courtesan's door, hoping to eavesdrop on his wife and the Courtesan's conversation. Wise to his tricks, the Courtesan loudly pretends to be giving Mistress Hairbrain moral instructions. Penitent and Mistress Hairbrain re-enter the bedroom. Mistress Hairbrain tells Penitent that they will have another opportunity to 'meet' in three days time, when her husband is planning to go on vacation.

Scene 3: Follywit's home in London

Follywit is worried that his uncle's inheritance might be intercepted by his mistress, the Courtesan (his spy, Mawworm has learned that Bounteous has a mistress, but he does not know her identity). In order to put the Courtesan out of his uncle's favor, he hatches an unspecified plot involving a blatantly ridiculous prostitute's costume.

=== Act IV ===
Scene 1: Penitent Brothel's bedroom

After reading about the dangers of adultery in a religious tract, Penitent starts to worry about the consequences his affair with Mistress Hairbrain may have on his soul. He delivers a penitent speech and resolves never to see her again. A demon disguised as Mistress Hairbrain enters. The demon tries to seduce Penitent, but Penitent resists. The demon exits. Shocked to his core, Penitent orders his servant to make sure that no woman comes near the house.

Scene 2: A room in Sir Bounteous' country house

Sir Bounteous' servant, Gunwater, tells Bounteous that the Courtesan has arrived—but there might be a problem: she has a linen cloth tied around her face (this 'Courtesan' is, in fact, Follywit in disguise). Excited by the prospect of a sexual rendezvous with the Courtesan, Bounteous disregards the linen cloth and tells Gunwater to prepare the bedroom.

Scene 3: A room in Sir Bounteous' country home

Gunwater directs the 'Countess' (Follywit) to the bedroom and makes a pass at her/him. He/she deflects his advances by agreeing to meet him at an inn the next day. As soon as Gunwater leaves, Follywit steals several valuables from a chest in the bedroom and takes off. Bounteous enters, sexually excited. He remarks that when he gave the Courtesan a kiss earlier, he detected a strong odour of beer, wine and tobacco. He is outraged when he discovers that his chest has been robbed, and furiously swears never to have anything to do with the Courtesan ever again.

Scene 4: Hairbrain's home

Penitent goes to the Hairbrain house to try to ascertain if it was a devil or Mistress Hairbrain who appeared to him in his bedroom. When Mistress Hairbrain denies any knowledge of the incident, he realizes that it was, in fact, a devil. He delivers another penitent speech, and advises Mistress Hairbrain to honour her vows of marriage. Mr. Hairbrain enters to catch the tail end of their conversation; he is pleased to hear Penitent giving his wife sound moral instructions. He invites Penitent to accompany them to a feast which will be held at Sir Bounteous' home on the following Tuesday.

Scene 5: A street in London

Follywit meets the Courtesan in the street and immediately falls in love. He tries to court her, but she resists his advances, which only makes him more determined. He speaks with her Mother, who tells him her daughter is an extremely bashful virgin, paranoid about losing her honour. These qualities seem to make Follywit desire her even more: "Give me a woman as she was made at first [i.e., before the Fall], simple of herself [i.e., pure], without sophistication, like this wench. I cannot abide them when they have tricks, set speeches and artful entertainments."

The Mother 'forces' the Courtesan to greet Follywit. The Courtesan puts on a great show of modesty. To assure her that his intentions are honourable, Follywit proposes marriage on the spot—quickly adding that he is heir to a great fortune. The Mother encourages him to send for a priest right away so the marriage can be sealed before her 'bashful' daughter has a chance to change her mind. Follywit makes plans to surprise his uncle by introducing his bride at the feast Bounteous is giving on Tuesday (the same feast—of course—that Penitent and the Hairbrains will attend). After Follywit exits, the Mother rejoices that her daughter has finally been "made honest".

=== Act V ===
Scene 1: Sir Bounteous' estate. The day of the feast

Sir Bounteous is busy making arrangements for his great feast. The Hairbrains enter. Bounteous greets them warmly and is introduced to Penitent. Follywit and his cohorts enter, disguised as a group of travelling players. Bounteous greets them warmly (especially after they tell him their patron is Lord Owemuch) and arranges to have them perform a play called The Slip at dinner. Follywit & co. exit.

The Courtesan and her Mother enter. Bounteous accuses the Courtesan of thievery. The Courtesan denies the charges and tells Bounteous that she has recently married. Bounteous says that her new husband is probably a worthless fellow. After a futile attempt to get her to confess to the robbery, he allows her to join the party. Follwit enters (disguised as a 'Player') and tells Bounteous that he needs to borrow a few props for the play. Bounteous gives him his ring, chain and a watch.

Scene 2: Bounteous' guests gather to see the play performed

Follywit delivers a brief prologue to the play and exits. Moments later, he re-enters in a fury because his cohorts have been arrested by a Constable. Worried that the disruption will ruin his wedding announcement, he decides to make the audience believe that the Constable is part of the play.

The Constable enters with Follywit's cohorts in tow. Pretending to be a justice, Follywit scolds the Constable for arresting the men without due cause and orders him bound and gagged. The audience members laugh as though it is all a part of the play. Follywit & co. exit. The Constable is left bound and gagged on stage. The audience laugh as he struggles to free himself.

After a while, Bounteous begins to feel sorry for the poor Constable and orders his servant to release him. Not long thereafter, another servant brings news that the 'players' have fled. Bounteous realizes that he has been tricked and robbed again (but he commends the thieves for their wit).

Follywit & co. enter, no longer disguised. Bounteous tells Follywit about the robbery he has just missed. Follywit feigns shock, but his ruse is exposed by the sound of his uncle's watch in his pocket. After searching his nephew's pockets, Bounteous discovers that Follywit has his ring and chain too; he demands an explanation.

Follywit explains that the robbery was all part of a final, harmless jest, his final prank now that he is—surprise!—a married man. Bounteous is not entirely convinced, but when he is introduced to the bride and realizes that his nephew has unwittingly married a prostitute, he laughs, toasts the marriage, and remarks on the poetic justice of the situation:

Come gentlemen, to th' feast, let not time waste;
We have pleased our ear, now let us please our taste
Who lives by cunning, mark it, his fate's cast;
When he has gulled all, then is himself the last.

== Adaptations/Updated versions ==
In 1977 an updated version of the play, by Barrie Keeffe, was performed by the Joint Stock Theatre Company at the Young Vic in London.

On 21 July 1983, BBC Radio 3 broadcast a production adapted by Peter Barnes and directed by Penny Gold, featuring Roy Marsden as Follywit, James Villiers as Sir Bounteous, Ian McDiarmid as Master Penitent, Theresa Streatfield as Francesca the Courtesan and Stephen Thorne as Master Harebrain. This production was rebroadcast on BBC Radio 3 on 7 October 1983 and on BBC Radio 4 Extra on 19 June 2021.

Sean Foley and Phil Porter edited the play for a 2013 Royal Shakespeare Company production, directed by Foley. They updated the setting of the play to 1950s Soho. It played in the Swan Theatre, Stratford-upon-Avon from June to October 2013.
