= Christopher Barker (printer) =

Christopher Barker (c.1529–1599) was the printer to Queen Elizabeth I. He was also the father of a printing dynasty that included his son Robert Barker, his grandsons Robert Constable and Francis Constable, and Richard Constable who is believed to be his grandson. He is most well-known for printing many editions of English Bibles during the Elizabethan Age, notably the Geneva Bible and the so-called Bishops' Bible. He was the official printer of the court of Elizabeth I of England and held exclusive patents to print Bibles.

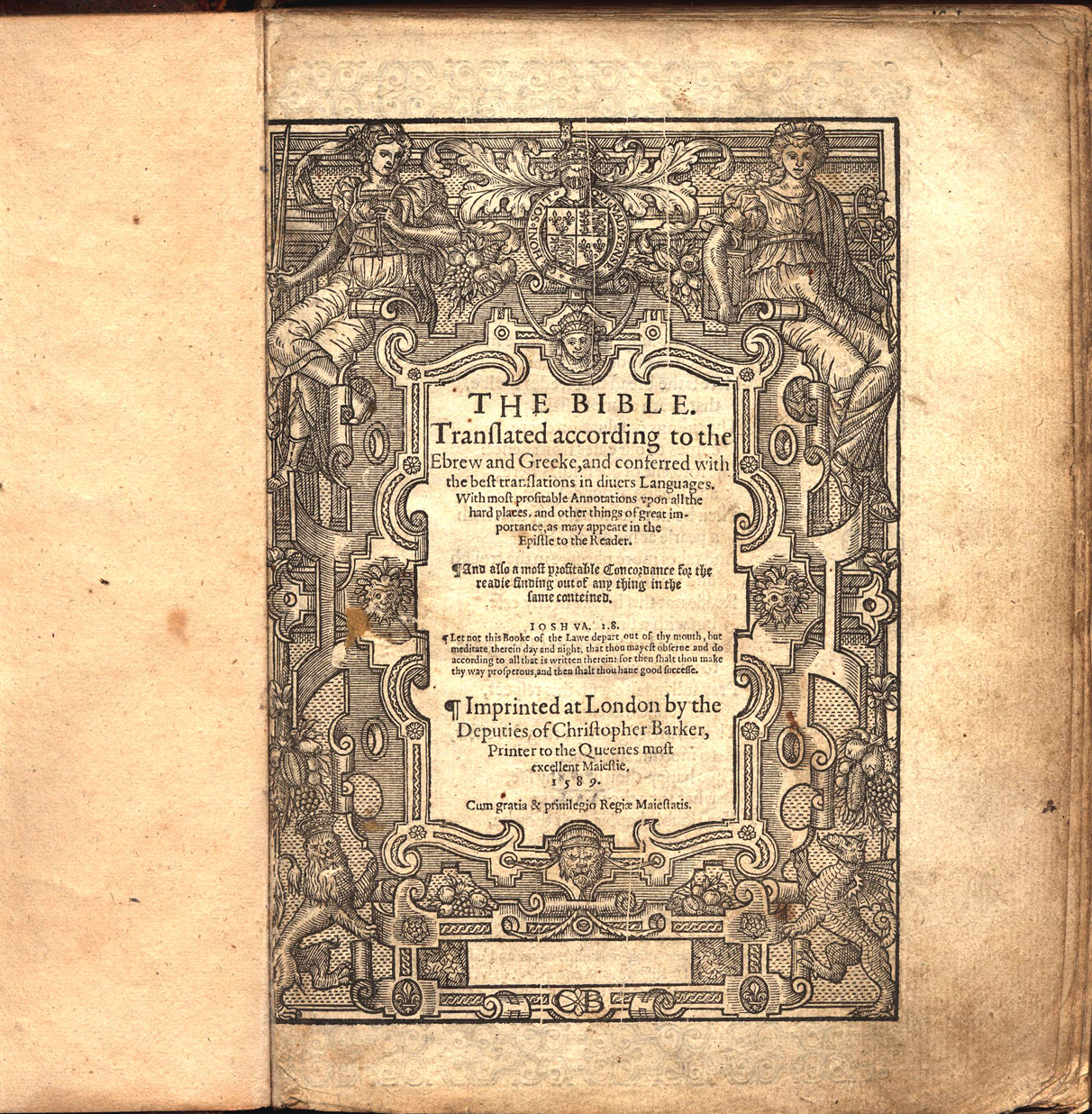
Geneva Bible Title Page 1589

The University of Glasgow, from their Printing in England from William Caxton to Christopher Barker, An Exhibition: November 1976 – April 1977 had this to say about Christopher's life and work:

An outstanding figure in the printing trade towards the end of the sixteenth century was Christopher Barker, a shrewd businessman who managed to acquire the most lucrative of all patents, namely the Bible patent. Born around 1529, Barker was a wealthy member of the Drapers’ Company with powerful friends at court, for he was closely connected with the Walsingham family. He is thought to have been the grand nephew of Sir Christopher Barker, a former Garter King of Arms, which would explain his wealth, since the various properties of Sir Christopher ultimately passed into the possession of his nephew, Edward Barker, thought to have been the printer’s father.

Barker became interested in the printing trade and is first heard of as a publisher in 1569. In 1576 he started on his career as a Bible printer, having obtained a privilege to print the Geneva version of the Bible in England. In 1577 he purchased from Sir Thomas Wilkes, Clerk of the Privy Council, an extensive patent which included the Old and New Testament in English, with or without notes, of any translation. The full patent granted to Barker the office of royal printer of all statutes, books, bills, Acts of Parliament, proclamations, injunctions, Bibles, and New Testaments, in the English tongue of any translation, all service books to be used in churches, and all other volumes ordered to be printed by the Queen or Parliament.

Barker’s business continued to thrive and from 1588 onwards he conducted it mainly through his deputies, George Bishop and Ralph Newbery. On the disgrace of Wilkes in 1589, Barker managed to obtain a renewal of his exclusive patent with reversion for life to his son Robert. Father and son lived in London at Bacon House in Noble Street, Aldersgate. Christopher Barker also had a house at Datchet, to which he retired after 1588, and there he died in 1599. He and his deputies had supplied the country with about seventy editions of the Scriptures between 1575 and 1599 and they were accurate and well printed. He was succeeded in the post of royal printer by his son Robert.
