= Richard Hawkins (publisher) =

English publisher (died 1633)

Richard Hawkins (died 1633) was a London publisher of the Jacobean and Caroline eras. He was a member of the syndicate that published the Second Folio collection of Shakespeare's plays in 1632. His bookshop was in Chancery Lane, near Sergeant's Inn.

== Beginnings ==
Hawkins served his apprenticeship under the stationer Edmond Matts in 1604–11; in turn he acquired Matts's business in 1613 and established himself as an independent publisher. In his first year, Hawkins reprinted John Marston's The Metamorphosis of Pigmalion's Image, a work originally issued by Matts in 1598. Hawkins's initial entry into the Stationers' Register was Elizabeth Tanfield Cary's The Tragedy of Mariam, which he also printed in 1613 — a work now recognized as the first tragedy by a woman to be published in English.

== Shakespeare ==
Hawkins's connection to the Shakespeare canon started in 1628; an entry in the Stationers' Register, dated 1 March that year, records the transfer of the rights to Othello from Thomas Walkley, the publisher of the play's first quarto (1622), to Hawkins. (The same transfer included the rights to the Beaumont and Fletcher plays Philaster and A King and No King.) Hawkins then published the second quarto of Othello (printed by Augustine Matthews) in 1630. Hawkins's text combined elements from the two previous texts, the 1622 first quarto and the First Folio of 1623, which showed significant differences. Hawkins's possession of the copyright to one Shakespearean play enabled him to become one of the subsidiary members of Robert Allot's syndicate (the others were William Aspley, Richard Meighen, and John Smethwick) when Allot published the Second Folio.

== Others ==
Beyond the confines of the Shakespeare canon, Hawkins a published number of other play texts. They included:

- the first quarto of Cary's The Tragedy of Mariam (1613), printed by Thomas Creede;
- the third quarto of Philaster (1628);
- the third quarto of Beaumont and Fletcher's The Maid's Tragedy (1630);
- the third quarto of A King and No King (1631).

A fourth quarto of Philaster was published, under Hawkins's imprint, posthumously in 1634.

Like some other publishers of his time, Hawkins sometimes wrote prefaces for the playbooks he issued. In his preface to Philaster, Hawkins compares the plays of English Renaissance drama to gold, and publishers to "merchant adventurers." Hawkins was one of the small minority who wrote prefatory material in verse, as in his editions of A King and No King and The Maid's Tragedy.

Hawkins published a range of contemporary literature in his generation, including a 1629 edition of Hero and Leander (Marlowe's poem with Chapman's continuation), and the 1619 and 1622 editions of the Nosce Teipsum of the poet John Davies of Hereford. He ventured into music publishing, with a 1631 edition of the canzonets of Thomas Morley. One of Hawkins's final projects was the first English edition of Mathematical Recreations (1633), by Jean Leurechon (alias "Hendrik van Etten") — translated by Francis Malthus, and printed by Thomas Cotes, the same man who printed the Second Folio.

Hawkins's widow, Ursula Hawkins, disposed of some of his copyrights after his death.
