= 1629 in literature =

This article contains information about the literary events and publications of 1629.

== Events ==
- January – Pedro Calderón de la Barca and his friends break into a convent in an attempt to seize Pedro de Villegas, who had stabbed Calderón's brother.
- April 6 – Tommaso Campanella is released from custody in Rome, and gains the confidence of Pope Urban VIII.
- July – Richard James lends Oliver St John a manuscript tract on the bridling of parliaments which was written in 1612 by Sir Robert Dudley, titular Duke of Northumberland. St John circulates it among parliamentary supporters, and James is arrested as a result.
- September – Pierre Corneille brings his first play, Mélite to a group of travelling actors.
- November 22 – The King's Men perform Othello at the Blackfriars Theatre in London.
- unknown dates
  - The first known performance is given at the Corral de comedias de Almagro in Spain (rediscovered in the 1950s) by Juan Martinez's theatrical company Autor.
  - Inigo Jones redesigns the Cockpit-in-Court in London as a venue for staging court masques.
  - In Japan, women's kabuki dance-drama is prohibited, and young men take over female roles. The prohibition would last until 1877.

== New books ==
=== Prose ===
- Balthazar Baro – Célinde, poème héroïque (prose work containing a poem at its core)
- Philipp Clüver (posthumous) – Introductio in Universam Geographiam (Introduction to Universal Geography)
- John Amos Comenius – Janua linguarum reserata
- Arthur Dee – Fasciculus Chemicus
- Robert Fludd – Medicina Catholica (Volume 1)
- Paul Laymann (attributed) – Processus juridicus contra sagas et vene fico
- Richard Sibbes – The Saint's Cordial

=== Drama ===
- Richard Brome
  - The Northern Lass
  - A Lovesick Maid (lost)
- Lodowick Carlell – The Deserving Favourite (published)
- William D'Avenant
  - The Just Italian (performed)
  - The Tragedy of Albovine (published)
- Alexandre Hardy – Coriolan (published)
- Ben Jonson – The New Inn
- Philip Massinger
  - The Picture (performed)
  - The Roman Actor (published)
- James Shirley – The Grateful Servant

=== Poetry ===
- John Beaumont – Bosworth Field; with a taste of the variety of other Poems left by Sir John Beaumont
- John Taylor – Wit and Mirth

== Births ==
- January 2 – Christian Scriver, German devotional writer (died 1693)
- April 14 – Christiaan Huygens, Dutch polymath (died 1695)
- August 18 – Agneta Horn, Swedish memoirist (died 1672)
- August 20 – Matthew Wren, English writer, cleric and politician (died 1672)
- September 10 – John Heydon, English Rosicrucian and writer on the occult (died c. 1677)
- Unknown date – Roderick O Flaherty, Irish historian (died c. 1717)
- Probable year of birth – Hester Biddle (Esther Biddle), English Quaker writer (died 1697)

== Deaths ==
- July 13 – Caspar Bartholin the Elder, Danish polymath (born 1585)
- July 27 – Thomas Goffe, English dramatist (born 1591)
- August – Thomas James, English librarian (born c. 1573)
- August 18 – Vendela Skytte, Swedish poet (born 1608)
- November – Robert Hayman, English-born Newfoundland poet (born 1574)
- Unknown date – John Speed, English historian and cartographer (born 1542)
