= Francis Beaumont =

English playwright (1584–1616)

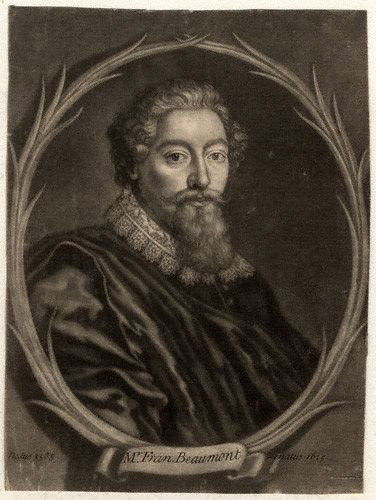
- Born: 1584; Grace-Dieu, England
- Died: 6 March 1616 (aged 31–32); London, England
- Writing career
- Notable work: The Knight of the Burning Pestle

Francis Beaumont (/ˈboʊmɒnt/ BOH-mont; 1584 – 6 March 1616) was a dramatist in the English Renaissance theatre, most famous for his collaborations with John Fletcher.

== Beaumont's life ==
Beaumont was the son of Sir Francis Beaumont of Grace Dieu, near Thringstone in Leicestershire, a justice of the common pleas. His mother was Anne, the daughter of Sir George Pierrepont (d. 1564), of Holme Pierrepont, and his wife Winnifred Twaits. Beaumont was born at the family seat and was educated at Broadgates Hall (now Pembroke College, Oxford) at age thirteen. Following the death of his father in 1598, he left university without a degree and followed in his father's footsteps by entering the Inner Temple in London in 1600.

Accounts suggest that Beaumont did not work long as a lawyer. He became a student of poet and playwright Ben Jonson; he was also acquainted with Michael Drayton and other poets and dramatists, and decided that was where his passion lay. His first work, Salmacis and Hermaphroditus, appeared in 1602. The 1911 edition of the Encyclopædia Britannica describes the work as "not on the whole discreditable to a lad of eighteen, fresh from the popular love-poems of Marlowe and Shakespeare, which it naturally exceeds in long-winded and fantastic diffusion of episodes and conceits." In 1605, Beaumont wrote commendatory verses to Jonson's Volpone.

Beaumont's collaboration with Fletcher may have begun as early as 1605. They had both hit an obstacle early in their dramatic careers with notable failures; Beaumont's The Knight of the Burning Pestle, first performed by the Children of the Blackfriars in 1607, was rejected by an audience who, the publisher's epistle to the 1613 quarto claims, failed to note "the privie mark of irony about it;" that is, they took Beaumont's satire of old-fashioned drama as an old-fashioned drama. The play received a lukewarm reception. The following year, Fletcher's Faithful Shepherdess failed on the same stage. In 1609, however, the two collaborated on Philaster, which was performed by the King's Men at the Globe Theatre and at Blackfriars. The play was a popular success, not only launching the careers of the two playwrights but also sparking a new taste for tragicomedy. According to a mid-century anecdote related by John Aubrey, they lived in the same house on the Bankside in Southwark, "sharing everything in the closest intimacy." About 1613 Beaumont married Ursula Isley, daughter and co-heiress of Henry Isley of Sundridge in Kent, by whom he had two daughters; Elizabeth and Frances (a posthumous child). He had a stroke between February and October 1613, after which he wrote no more plays, but was able to write an elegy for Lady Penelope Clifton, who died 26 October 1613. Beaumont died in 1616 and was buried in Westminster Abbey. Although today Beaumont is remembered as a dramatist, during his lifetime he was also celebrated as a poet.

== Beaumont's plays ==
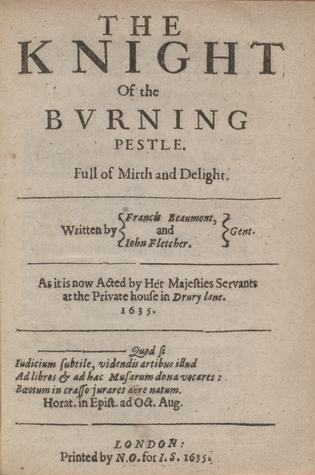
The Knight of the Burning Pestle, one of Beaumont's early plays.

It was once written of Beaumont and Fletcher that "in their joint plays their talents are so...completely merged into one, that the hand of Beaumont cannot clearly be distinguished from that of Fletcher." Yet this romantic notion did not stand up to critical examination.

In the seventeenth century, Sir Aston Cockayne, a friend of Fletcher's, specified that there were many plays in the 1647 Beaumont and Fletcher folio that contained nothing of Beaumont's work, but rather featured the writing of Philip Massinger. Nineteenth- and twentieth-century critics like E.H.C. Oliphant subjected the plays to a self-consciously literary, and often subjective and impressionistic, reading – but nonetheless began to differentiate the hands of the collaborators. This study was carried much farther, and onto a more objective footing, by twentieth-century scholars, especially Cyrus Hoy. Short of absolute certainty, a critical consensus has evolved on many plays in the canon of Fletcher and his collaborators; in regard to Beaumont, the schema below is among the least controversial that has been drawn.

By Beaumont alone:

- The Knight of the Burning Pestle, comedy (performed 1607; printed 1613)
- The Masque of the Inner Temple and Gray's Inn, masque (performed 20 February 1613; printed 1613?)

With Fletcher:

- The Woman Hater, comedy (1606; 1607)
- Cupid's Revenge, tragedy (c. 1607–12; 1615)
- Philaster, or Love Lies a-Bleeding, tragicomedy (c. 1609; 1620)
- The Maid's Tragedy, tragedy (c. 1609; 1619)
- A King and No King, tragicomedy (1611; 1619)
- The Captain, comedy (c. 1609–12; 1647)
- The Scornful Lady, comedy (c. 1613; 1616)
- Love's Pilgrimage, tragicomedy (c. 1615–16; 1647)
- The Noble Gentleman, comedy (licensed 3 February 1626; 1647)

Beaumont/Fletcher plays, later revised by Massinger:

- Thierry and Theodoret, tragedy (c. 1607?; 1621)
- The Coxcomb, comedy (c. 1608–10; 1647)
- Beggars' Bush, comedy (c. 1612–13?; revised 1622?; 1647)
- Love's Cure, comedy (c. 1612–13?; revised 1625?; 1647)

Because of Fletcher's highly distinctive and personal pattern of linguistic preferences and contractional forms (ye for you, 'em for them, etc.), his hand can be distinguished fairly easily from Beaumont's in their collaborations. In A King and No King, for example, Beaumont wrote all of Acts I, II, and III, plus scenes IV. iv and V. ii & iv; Fletcher wrote only the first three scenes in Act IV (IV, i–iii) and the first and third scenes in Act V (V, i & iii) – so that the play is more Beaumont's than Fletcher's. The same is true of The Woman Hater, The Maid's Tragedy, The Noble Gentleman, and Philaster. On the other hand, Cupid's Revenge, The Coxcomb, The Scornful Lady, Beggar's Bush, and The Captain are more Fletcher's than Beaumont's. In Love's Cure and Thierry and Theodoret, the influence of Massinger's revision complicates matters; but in those plays too, Fletcher appears to be the majority contributor, Beaumont the minority.
