= Philaster (play) =

1620 play by Beaumont and Fletcher

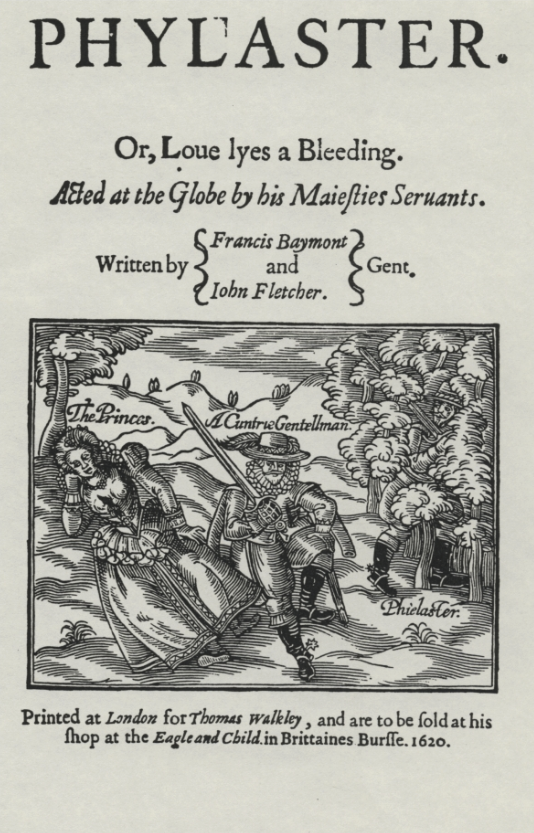
1620 quarto text title page

Philaster, or Love Lies a-Bleeding is an early Jacobean era stage play, a tragicomedy written by Francis Beaumont and John Fletcher. One of the duo's earliest successes, the play helped to establish the trend for tragicomedy that was a powerful influence in early Stuart-era drama.

== Date and performance ==
While the date of the play's origin cannot be fixed with certainty, Philaster must pre-date 1611, based on its mention by John Davies in his Scourge of Folly – Davies's book was entered into the Stationers' Register on 8 October 1610, and was printed soon after. Scholars generally assign the play to 1608–10, with the middle to late summer of 1610 as perhaps the most likely. The play was acted by the King's Men at both the Globe and Blackfriars theatres, and was performed at court twice in the winter of 1612–13.

== Publication ==
The play was first published in 1620 by the bookseller Thomas Walkley, in a seriously defective text; Walkley issued a second quarto two years later (1622), which he termed "The second impression, corrected and amended." A third quarto was printed in 1628 by Richard Hawkins, followed by subsequent editions in 1634, 1639, 1652, and 1687; there was also an undated quarto that may date to 1663. Scholars have debated the cause of the differences between Q1 and the subsequent editions; the modern critical consensus favours censorship as the most plausible explanation. The villain in the original version of the play (represented by Q2 and later editions) was a Spaniard, the favourite stage villain in English drama at least since the Spanish Armada. King James I, however, favoured a pacifistic foreign policy and improved relations with Spain, so that the play needed to be revised for Court performance, primarily in the opening (I,i) and closing scenes (V,iii-iv, yielding the Q1 version. Andrew Gurr's modern edition prints the Q1 alterations in an appendix.

== Authorship ==
Traditional critics recognised that Beaumont's share in the play is dominant over Fletcher's. Cyrus Hoy, in his sweeping examination of the authorship problems in Fletcher's canon, produced this division of authorship in the play:

Beaumont – Act I, scene 2; Act II, 1, 3, and 4a (to Pharamond's entrance); Act III; Act IV, 3–6; Act V, 1, 2, 3a (to King's exit), and 5;
Fletcher – Act I, scene 1; Act II, 2 and 4b (from Pharamond's entrance); Act IV, 1 and 2; Act V, 3b (from King's exit) and 4.

== Adaptations ==
Philaster was revived during the Restoration era in an adapted form, as were many of the plays in the canon of Fletcher and his collaborators; but the 1695 adaptation by Elkanah Settle was not a success. Another adaptation followed, though, by George Colman (printed 1763). The version by George Villiers, 2nd Duke of Buckingham (c. 1683; published 1714) was unperformed in his era.

== Synopsis ==
The play is set in a fictionalised version of the Kingdom of Sicily, ruled by an unnamed king. This king's father and predecessor, the ruler of Southern Italy (the Kingdom of Naples), had conquered the island of Sicily and displaced the native royal house; but the heir of that house, and rightful king of Sicily, is Philaster, who lives as a nobleman in the royal court. The king fears him, but cannot kill him because of the passionate loyalty of the people. The king has a plan, however: with no son of his own, he will marry his daughter Arethusa to a Spanish prince named Pharamond, and make the Spaniard his heir.

Arethusa, however, is in love with Philaster, and disdains the Spaniard. Philaster reciprocates the princess's affections, and sends his page Bellario to serve her and to be their intermediary. Arethusa is able to frustrate her father's plan by exposing Pharamond's affair with Megra, a loose gentlewoman of the court; but the Spaniard seeks revenge, by spreading reports that Arethusa is having an affair with Bellario. The passionate Philaster is deceived by the slander. During a hunt, Philaster confronts Arethusa; the overwrought protagonist stabs the princess (the incident that gives the play its subtitle). Philaster is interrupted by a passing countryman; they fight, and both men are wounded. Philaster crawls off, and Arethusa is discovered by nobles of the court.

Arethusa's and Philaster's wounds are not fatal; both recover. Philaster is found, arrested, and sentenced to death. The king places Philaster in Arethusa's custody; she quickly marries him, which causes the king to decree her death as well. The executions are frustrated when the rebellious citizens capture Pharamond and hold him hostage. The falsehood of Pharamond's accusation against Arethusa is exposed when Bellario is revealed to be a disguised woman (she is Euphrasia, a courtier's daughter, infatuated with Philaster). Pharamond retreats to Spain. Since the rightful ruler of Sicily is now the king's son and no alternative presents itself, Philaster is restored to his crown.

== Characters ==
- The King
- Philaster (Known as "Phylaster" in Q1) – the "true heir"
- Pharamond – the Prince of Spain
- Dion – A Lord
- Cleremont and Thrasiline – noble gentlemen his associates
- Arethusa – the King's Daughter
- Galatea
- Megra
- Euphrasia (Bellario) – Daughter of Dion
- Bellario - Page of Arethusa

Some character lists (found in Q3 onward) also include an "old wanton lady, or crone" although Q1 does not, and Q2 has no actual character list.
