= John Smethwick =

English publisher (died 1641)

John Smethwick (died 1641) was a London publisher of the Elizabethan, Jacobean, and Caroline eras. Along with colleague William Aspley, Smethwick was one of the "junior partners" in the publishing syndicate that issued the First Folio collection of Shakespeare's plays in 1623. As his title pages specify, his shop was "in St. Dunstan's Churchyard in Fleet Street, under the Dial."

== Career ==
He was the son of a London draper, and began a nine-year apprenticeship under a Thomas Newman at Christmas 1589 (though he was emancipated early by his master's widow). Like Aspley, Smethwick enjoyed a career of unusual longevity: he became a "freeman" (a full member) of the Stationers Company on 17 January 1597, and continued in business for more than four decades. In the earlier phases of his career, Smethwick was repeatedly fined for selling books to which he lacked the rights; but in later years he rose to be successively Junior Warden (1631), Senior Warden (1635), and Master (1639) of the Stationers Company. For a portion of his career Smethwick was partnered with John Jaggard, the brother of William Jaggard, the printer of the First Folio.

== Shakespeare ==
Smethwick's connection with the Shakespeare canon began in 1607: in an entry in the Stationers' Register dated 19 November that year, stationer Nicholas Ling transferred the copyrights of Romeo and Juliet, Love's Labor's Lost, and Hamlet to Smethwick. (At the same time, Smethwick acquired from Ling the rights to The Taming of a Shrew, the early alternative version of Shakespeare's The Shrew.) Two of these plays were subsequently published in quarto by Smethwick – Romeo and Juliet in 1609 (the third quarto) and Hamlet in 1611 (also Q3).

Smethwick's possession of these copyrights eventually involved him in the First Folio project. When Edward Blount and William and Isaac Jaggard were preparing to print the Folio, c. 1620, they had to obtain the rights to eighteen plays that had already been printed. Two copyright holders, Aspley and Smethwick, chose to participate in the Folio project as partners with Blount and the Jaggards. Again like Aspley, Smethwick retained his Shakespearean copyrights to join in Robert Allot's Second Folio in 1632.

A few Shakespearean plays continued to be printed in quarto editions after 1623 – and Smethwick was responsible for several of these late quartos. He issued the second quarto of Love's labor's Lost in 1631. He published the undated Q4 of Romeo and Juliet (1623?), and followed it with Q5 in 1637. In the same era he issued the undated Q4 of Hamlet (1625?) and the Q5 of 1637.

== Others ==
Inevitably, Smethwick also published a large body of non-Shakespearean literature as well. Notably, he issued an important collection of the Poems of Michael Drayton, in seven editions from 1608 to 1637. He published Sir David Murray's The Tragical Death of Sophonisba and Coelia in 1611, and an edition of Thomas Lodge's Rosalynde: Euphues' Golden Legacy in 1612. He produced the second and third edition of Francis Beaumont's The Knight of the Burning Pestle (both 1635).
