= William Aspley =

William Aspley (died 1640) was an English publisher in London during the Elizabethan, Jacobean, and Caroline eras. He was a member of the publishing syndicates that issued the First Folio and Second Folio collections of Shakespeare's plays, in 1623 and 1632.

== Life ==
Aspley was the son of a William Aspley of Royston of Cambridgeshire. He served a nine-year apprenticeship under George Bishop that started at Christmas 1587.

Aspley's professional career was notable for its longevity: he became a "freeman" (a full member) of the Stationers Company on 4 April 1597, and remained active for the next four decades. He served in the office of Master of the Company in 1640, the year he died. His shops were located 1) at the sign of the Tiger's Head, and 2) at the sign of the Parrot, both in St. Paul's Churchyard. (The Parrot was on the same block as the shop of First Folio colleague Edward Blount, at the sign of the Black Bear.)

== Shakespeare ==
Aspley's connection with the Shakespeare canon began in 1600: on 23 August that year, he and fellow stationer Andrew Wise entered into the Stationers' Register the plays Henry IV, Part 2 and Much Ado About Nothing, so establishing their right to publish the works. Both plays were issued in individual quartos before the end of 1600, editions printed for Wise and Aspley by Valentine Simmes. Neither play appears to have been a major success in printed form, since neither was reprinted prior to its inclusion in the First Folio in 1623.

Aspley had another, minor link to Shakespeare: some copies of Thomas Thorpe's first edition of Shakespeare's Sonnets (1609) read "to be sold by William Aspley" on their title pages. Yet it was his possession of the copyrights to two Shakespearean plays that won him inclusion in the First Folio syndicate. At the start of the 17th century's third decade, when Edward Blount and William and Isaac Jaggard were preparing to publish the First Folio, they needed to obtain the rights to eighteen Shakespearean plays already in print. (They had trouble getting the rights to Troilus and Cressida, and stuck that play into the First Folio late and unpaginated.) Aspley's price for his rights was inclusion in the syndicate as one of its "junior partners," along with John Smethwick. It is not known that Aspley played any active role in the publication of the First Folio; but he maintained his rights through Robert Allot's publication of the Second Folio in 1632.

== Other drama ==
Aspley also published some other play texts of English Renaissance drama, including:

- the anonymous A Warning for Fair Women (1599);
- Thomas Dekker's Old Fortunatus (1600);
- the two quartos of Marston's The Malcontent that appeared in 1604;
- the two quartos of the famously controversial Eastward Ho (By Chapman, Ben Jonson, and John Marston) that were both issued in 1605;
- the first two quartos of George Chapman's Bussy D'Ambois (Q1, 1607; Q2, 1608).

== Other works ==
And of course Aspley published a great variety of other works during his long career, by authors ranging from Francis Bacon to José de Acosta. He issued an abundant supply of religious works, as was normal for his era; John Boys' An Exposition of the Last Psalm (1615) is only one example. One curious item in Apsley's catalogue was Sebastien Michaelis's The Admirable History of Possession and Conversion of a Penitent Woman: Seduced by a Magician that Made Her to Become a Witch (1613).
