= Thomas Thorpe =

16th/17th-century English publisher

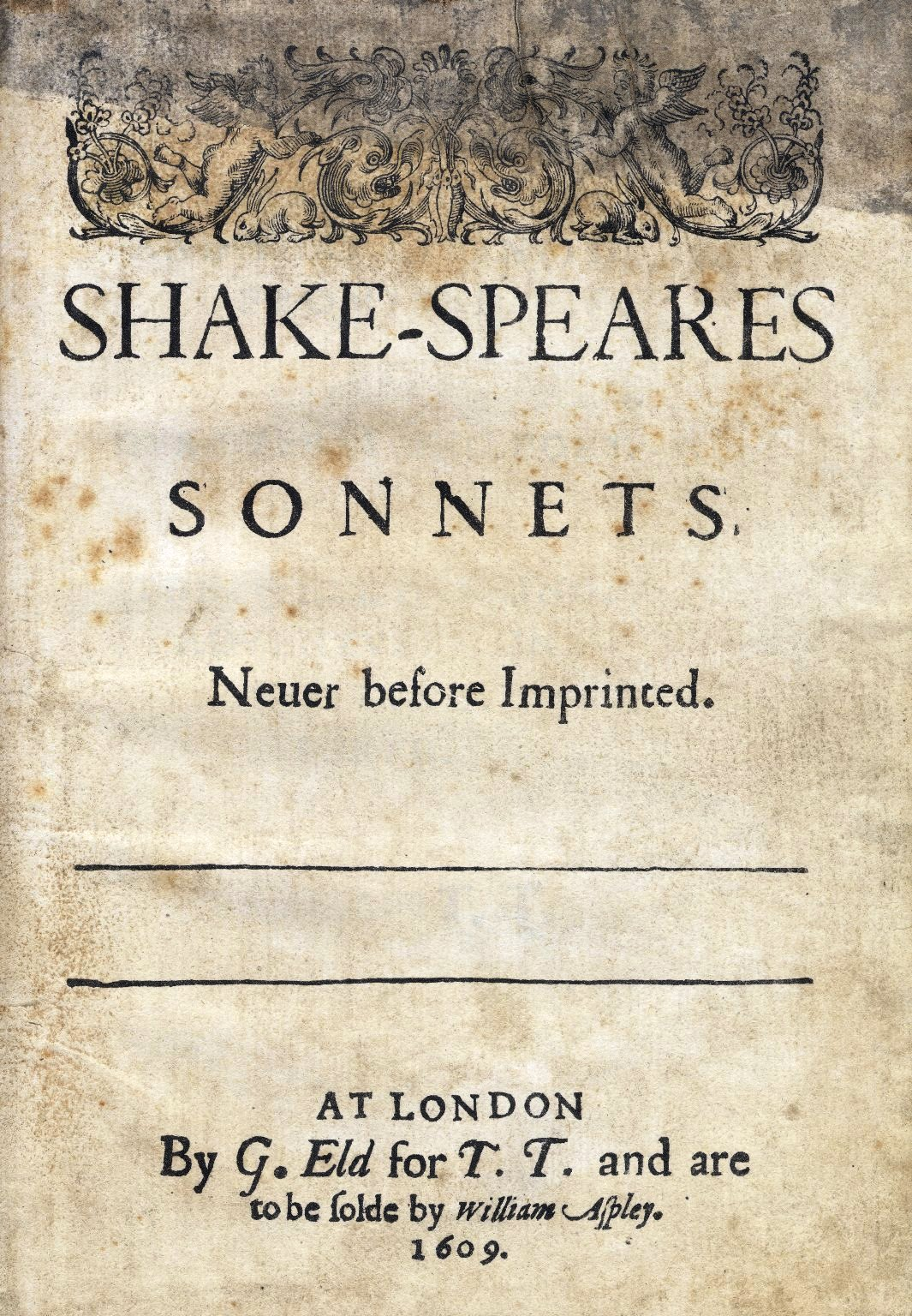
Thorpe edition of the sonnets. Thorpe is identified by his initials, T.T.

Thomas Thorpe (c. 1569 – c. 1625) was an English publisher, most famous for publishing Shakespeare's sonnets and several works by Christopher Marlowe and Ben Jonson. His publication of the sonnets has long been controversial. Nineteenth-century critics thought that he might have published the poems without Shakespeare's consent; Sidney Lee called him "predatory and irresponsible." Conversely, modern scholars Wells and Taylor assert their verdict that "Thorpe was a reputable publisher, and there is nothing intrinsically irregular about his publication."

== Life ==
The son of an innkeeper in Barnet, Middlesex, Thorpe worked as an apprentice to Richard Watkins for nine years in a small shop. In 1594 Thorpe obtained his publishing rights, but was still without his printing rights. His first book published was The First Book of Lucan, Marlowe's translation of the Pharsalia, the copyright of which he received from Edward Blount, who would come to be a close friend of Thorpe's. He then returned the favour by dedicating the volume to Blount, which was quite unorthodox for the time: publications were generally dedicated to noblemen, local celebrities, aristocracy, royalty, and other men of distinction.

In 1605 Thorpe's publishing career took off, as he published George Chapman's All Fools and Ben Jonson's Sejanus His Fall, the latter of which was also provided by Blount. It has even been speculated that Jonson himself may have even been involved in the printing, with critic Jonas Barish noting "The exactness of the marginal annotations, the closeness with which the typography conveyed Jonson's metrical intentions, and the corrections made in proof all suggest that Jonson oversaw the printing himself."

Thorpe was a mysterious anomaly among the stationers of his generation: there is no evidence that he ever maintained either a print shop or a bookshop – and without such a facility it is hard to comprehend how he stayed in business. Yet he managed: he commissioned printers to do his printing and arranged for booksellers to sell his books. For one example, his 1609 edition of Shakespeare's Sonnets (see below) was printed by George Eld, and sold by William Aspley and William Wright. Thorpe had a cryptic relationship with Aspley; together the two men entered plays into the Stationers' Register – The Malcontent on 5 July 1604, and Eastward Ho on 4 September 1605 – yet when the plays were published soon after, they were issued by Aspley alone. Thorpe remained in business until at least 1624, when he and Blount transferred the copyright of Marlowe's Hero and Leander to fellow stationer Simon Vicars.

Thomas Thorpe stopped publishing in 1625, the probable year of his death. Dorcas Thorpe of St. Olave Southwark was granted administration of the estate of her late husband Thomas Thorpe on 30 July. Thorpe also stopped receiving his pension from the Stationers' Company that year, which strengthens the evidence for his death that year.

=== The Sonnets ===
In 1609, Thorpe published the most important work of his career, Shakespeare's Sonnets. His apparent disregard for Shakespeare's permission earned him a poor reputation, although modern author Katherine Duncan-Jones argued that he was not such a "scoundrel" as he was portrayed, and the amiable and admirable Blount would certainly not associate with him if he were a scoundrel. It has even been suggested that Shakespeare did sell his manuscript to Thorpe, because of his acquaintance with Jonson as an actor in Sejanus, who may have recommended Thorpe to him as a good publisher. The dedication, which is addressed to a mysterious Mr. W.H., may have been written either by Shakespeare himself or by Thorpe. Thorpe was probably responsible for the arrangement of the sonnets, with 1–17 being the "procreation sonnets", 18–126 being love sonnets to the Fair Youth (for the most part), and 127–154 being written on a variety of subjects, including politics, sex, and the Dark Lady. Critics have failed to agree whether or not his arrangement was the most apt, but most detect a logical coherence in the order, which is generally retained today. The possibility that the manuscript was provided to Thomas Thorpe by a needy "MR. W. H.," the dedicatee of the volume and the poems' possible recipient, seems seldom to have been explored.

== Notable published works ==
- 1600 – The First Book of Lucan by Christopher Marlowe
- 1605 – All Fools by George Chapman
- 1605 – Sejanus by Ben Jonson
- 1606 – The Gentleman Usher by George Chapman
- 1606 – Hymenaei by Ben Jonson
- 1607 – What You Will by John Marston
- 1607 – Volpone by Ben Jonson
- 1608 – The Masque of Blackness and The Masque of Beauty by Ben Jonson
- 1608 – The Conspiracy and Tragedy of Charles, Duke of Byron by George Chapman
- 1609 – Shake-speare's sonnets by William Shakespeare
