= John Martyn (publisher) =

John Martyn, or Martin (died in 1680), was a prominent London publisher and bookseller in the second half of the 17th century.

Martyn started in business in 1649, in partnership with John Ridley; their shop was at the sign of the Castle in Fleet Street, near Ram Alley. In 1651, Martyn began an independent establishment at the sign of the Bell in St. Paul's Churchyard, "without Temple bar." He continued there for the remainder of his career. He often worked in partnership with other London stationers; he was joined at the Bell by James Allestry, who was his partner there from 1652 until 1664, when Allestry opened his own shop at the sign of the Rose and Crown. They were joined by Thomas Dicas, from 1660 to Dicas's death in 1669. In 1663 Allestry and Martyn became the monopoly publishers for the Royal Society; Martyn continued in this role after Allestry's death in November 1670.

Allestry and Martyn, and then Martyn alone, served as the Royal Society's publishers through the crucial first two decades of the organization's existence. They issued all of its printed documents, including the Philosophical Transactions; they published Thomas Sprat's History of the Royal Society (1667), and Robert Hooke's Micrographia (1665). On his own, Martyn was an accomplished publisher of law books and of texts in Latin and Greek; his edition of Thomas Blount's legal dictionary Νομο-λεχικον ("Novo-lexicon," 1671) is a noteworthy example.

Martyn was responsible for a wide range of books, including the religious works that were so characteristic of his century, like Edward Wetenhall's Enter into Thy Closet, or A Method and Order for Private Devotion (1666). He issued Francis North's A Philosophical Essay of Music and John Milton's The History of Britain, both in 1677; and he published medical works, like the London Pharmacopoeia of the Royal College of Physicians (also 1677).

He also published two important works of English literature. He and Allestry issued Samuel Butler's Hudibras, Part 2, in 1664; with Henry Herringman, Martyn published Parts 1 and 2 of Hudibras together in 1674; and he and Herringman issued the complete 3-part work in 1678. Martyn also partnered with Herringman and Richard Marriot for the second Beaumont and Fletcher folio of 1679.

In 1681, Martyn's widow donated a silver bowl to the Stationers Company in her husband's memory.
