= Edward Blount =

English publisher (1562–1632)

- Born: 1562
- Died: 1632 (aged 69–70)
- Occupation: Publisher

Edward Blount (or Blunt) (1562–1632) was a London publisher of the Elizabethan, Jacobean, and Caroline eras, noted for his publication, in conjunction with William and Isaac Jaggard, of the First Folio of Shakespeare's plays in 1623.

He was baptised in London on 31 January 1562; the Stationers' Register states that he was the son of Ralph Blount or Blunt, merchant tailor of London, and apprenticed himself in 1578 for ten years to the stationer William Ponsonby. Blount became a "freeman" (a full member) of the Stationers' Company on 25 June 1588.

Among the most important of his publications are Giovanni Florio's Italian-English dictionary and his translation of Montaigne, plus Marlowe's Hero and Leander (1598), and the Six Court Comedies of John Lyly (1632). He himself translated Ars Aulica, or the Courtier's Arte (1607) from the Italian of Lorenzo Ducci, and Christian Policie (1632) from the Spanish of Juan de Santa María.

Though best remembered for the First Folio, Blount also published works by Miguel de Cervantes, Ben Jonson, Samuel Daniel, William Camden, José de Acosta and other important authors. Blount has been described as "a genuine lover of literature, with discriminating and generous taste." Beyond the Folio, Blount had other minor connections with the Shakespearean canon. In 1601 he published Robert Chester's Love's Martyr, the volume that contained The Phoenix and the Turtle; he entered both Antony and Cleopatra and Pericles, Prince of Tyre in the Stationers' Register in 1608, though he published neither. Blount was also a close friend and professional colleague of Thomas Thorpe, the publisher of Shakespeare's sonnets.

Blount published at the sign of the Black Bear in St Paul's Churchyard, an area virtually synonymous with Paternoster Row.

Blount was dead by October 1632.
