= Robert Allot =

English bookseller and publisher (died 1635)

- Died: 1635
- Occupations: Bookseller, publisher

Robert Allot (died 1635) was a London bookseller and publisher of the early Caroline era; his shop was at the sign of the black bear in St. Paul's Churchyard. Though he was in business for a relatively short time – the decade from 1625 to 1635 – Allot had significant connections with the dramatic canons of the two greatest figures of English Renaissance theatre, William Shakespeare and Ben Jonson.

== Background ==
Robert Allot became a "freeman" of the Stationers Company (a full member of the London guild of booksellers) on 9 November 1625. Allot was a younger son of an Edward Allot of Crigleston in Yorkshire, near Wakefield. Robert's brother, another Edward Allot (died 1636, age 33), was a surgeon and Bachelor of Medicine at the University of Cambridge. Nineteenth-century commentators sometimes confused Robert Allot, the publisher who died in 1635, with an earlier Robert Allot, a minor poet and fellow of St. John's College, Cambridge and Linacre Professor of Physic, who edited the verse anthology England's Parnassus (1600). In actuality, the two Robert Allots were uncle and nephew.

== Shakespeare ==
An entry in the Stationers' Register dated 16 November 1630 transferred the rights to sixteen Shakespearean plays from Edward Blount, one of the publishers of the First Folio of Shakespeare's plays, to Robert Allot; these were sixteen of the eighteen plays in the First Folio that had not been previously published in quarto editions. Possession of the rights to the sixteen plays made Allot the "principal publisher" of the Shakespeare Second Folio when it appeared in 1632.

== Jonson ==
In 1631, at the same time he was working on the looming Second Folio, Allot was slated to serve as the publisher of a second collection of works by Ben Jonson. Jonson planned the volume as a supplement to the famous 1616 folio of his plays, masques, and poems; the proposed second volume was to include works Jonson had written in the intervening years. Jonson, however, became dissatisfied with the quality of John Beale's printing of the texts; he cancelled the venture. [See: Ben Jonson folios.]

== Others ==
Allot also published other dramatic texts of his era, including Philip Massinger's The Roman Actor (1629) and The Maid of Honour (1632), and Aurelian Townshend's 1631 Court masque Albion's Triumph. He published volumes of work by Sir Thomas Overbury, George Wither, James Mabbe, and Thomas Randolph. He issued a number of the chivalric romances that were immensely popular in his era. Allot also served as the London retail outlet for books printed at the press of Oxford University. In another direction, Allot bought and sold books with the Cambridge bookseller Troylus Atkinson, who served the town's university community.

And of course Allot published many now-obscure writers and works, from Elizabeth Joscelin's The Mother's Legacy to Her Unborn Child to the Microcosmography of John Earle, Bishop of Salisbury.

== Post mortem ==
After his death, Allot's widow married stationer Philip Chetwinde, which gave Chetwinde Allot's rights to plays by Shakespeare and Jonson. Chetwinde used Allot's Shakespearean copyrights to publish the Shakespeare Third Folio of 1663/4. Rights to Jonson plays were utilized in the second folio of Jonson's works (1640/1) published by Richard Meighen.
