= The Court Secret =

Play by James Shirley

The Court Secret is a Caroline era stage play, a tragicomedy written by James Shirley, and first published in 1653. It is generally regarded as the final play Shirley wrote as a professional dramatist.

Though The Court Secret can seem, to a modern taste, a confection of romantic fluff, exaggerated and wildly unrealistic (see the Synopsis below), it has been read as an index of the social anxieties and stresses of England at the crisis point of 1642, suggesting the conflict "between royalty and the rest," between the demands of royalist absolutism and the urges of ordinary humanity at the start of the English Civil War.

== Date and performance ==
The play's title page in its first edition states that The Court Secret was never acted, but was intended to be produced at the Blackfriars Theatre. This identifies the play as belonging to the final phase of Shirley's professional career: he wrote regularly for the King's Men at the Blackfriars in the 1640–42 era, after he had returned from Ireland and the Werburgh Street Theatre. The implication is that The Court Secret would have followed The Sisters on the Blackfriars stage, but was forestalled when the theatres closed in September 1642.

The play, however, was staged during the Restoration era, by the King's Company at their Bridge Street theatre. Samuel Pepys recorded in his Diary that his wife saw the play the afternoon of 18 August 1664. (She didn't like it: "My wife says the play...is the worst that ever she saw in her life.") "The Court Secret stands almost alone as a play composed for the Caroline, but produced first on the Restoration, stage." Another production occurred in 1682, again by the King's Company, at Theatre Royal, Drury Lane.

== Publication ==
The play was published in 1653 in the octavo collection Six New Plays, issued by the booksellers Humphrey Robinson and Humphrey Moseley. The other five Shirley plays in that collection are The Sisters, The Brothers, The Cardinal, The Doubtful Heir, and The Imposture. Each play has a separate title page and (except for the first) a separate dedication; Shirley dedicated The Court Secret to William Wentworth, the son of the executed Earl of Strafford, whom Shirley had praised in the Epilogue to his The Royal Master (1638).

== The manuscript ==
The play also exists in a manuscript text, probably created in 1642, that displays significant differences from the later printed version. The manuscript shows the play in an early stage of its development; it is in the hand of a professional scribe, but contains corrections and additions in Shirley's handwriting. The MS. "contains scenes and portions of scenes" not in the 1653 printed text; "there are several characters...that were afterwards dropped." The MS. also shows signs of preparation for production, so that it is uncertain which version of the play, the MS. or the printed text, was acted onstage in 1664.

== Synopsis ==
A Spanish nobleman named Piraquo was banished from Spain in his youth; after a very profitable career as a pirate and a stay at the royal court of Portugal, his banishment has been lifted by Don Carlo, the heir to the Spanish throne. Piraquo's son Don Manuel is a close friend to Don Carlo, and returns to Spain with his father. Don Manuel quickly falls in love with Clara, the daughter of Duke Mendoza. Clara loves him in return and agrees to marry him – but the Spanish princess, Maria, also falls for Manuel, even though she is betrothed to marry Prince Antonio of Portugal. Don Carlo is also engaged to a Portuguese princess, Isabella – though Carlo too is in love with Clara.

Carlo's and Maria's father, the King of Spain, is unhappy about all of this. The King's brother, Roderigo, informs Prince Antonio that Carlo courts Clara instead of Maria; he provokes Carlo's anger at the idea that Manuel is courting Maria. The fact that this is not strictly true does not bother Roderigo; the play's Machiavellian stage villain, he creates as much trouble as he can.

Yet another complication arises: Pedro, who is both a kinsman to Piraquo and Manuel and a servant to Duke Mendoza, knows a secret — the "court secret" of the title, which somehow involves Duke Mendoza and a mysterious treasure, and Carlo and Manuel too. The jealous Prince Antonio meanwhile provokes a duel with Manuel, which leads to Manuel's imprisonment. A meeting between Clara and Princess Maria shows them that they are rivals for Manuel's love; similarly Carlo and Manuel learn that they are rivals for Clara. Don Carlo gains Manuel's release and reconciles him with Prince Antonio; Manuel responds by releasing Clara from their marriage contract and letting her choose for herself — though Clara once again chooses Manuel. Carlo, stung by her rejection, challenges Manuel to a duel; Clara suspects, but Manuel pacifies her fears.

Arriving at the place appointed for the duel, Manuel hears cries of alarm; a page runs to him and says that a Moor has killed Don Carlo. Manuel rushes to Carlo's rescue, meets, fights with, and defeats the Moor...who turns out to be Carlo is disguise. At the same time, Princess Isabella arrives from Portugal, and the court is thrown into disorder when Don Carlo cannot be found. Manuel reveals what has happened; and Duke Mendoza is prominent among the voices that call for Manuel's punishment. But Prince Antonio reveals that the dying Carlo confessed his ruse, and that Manuel though he was rescuing Carlo rather than killing him. More crucially, Piraquo and Pedro reveal the "court secret" — a baby switch: the dead man is actually Mendoza's son Julio, whom Mendoza and his wife, the baby's nurse, had put in Carlo's place when the royal infant was stolen by pirates. (Which means that the false Don Carlo, in pursuing Clara, was courting his own sister.)

Clara and Princess Maria meet in Manuel's prison cell. Manuel, who does not yet know the truth about Carlo/Julio, tries to persuade Maria that she must renounce him, since he killed her brother — but Maria still will not yield. Manuel asks Clara to play Maria's part, to show how impossible the situation is; but Clara, knowing the court secret, also says that she can still love him despite the death. The exasperated Manuel tells Clara-playing-Maria that their love can never be — and Clara faints. Watching Manuel trying to revive Clara and seeing the strength of their mutual bond, Maria yields her interest in Manuel, and informs him of Carlo's true identity. Maria ultimately accepts her original intended spouse, Prince Antonio.

Yet since this is a tragicomedy, Julio the false prince is not really dead; he recovers from his wound. While recovering, he sends messages to Isabella begging her forgiveness for his duplicity; and Isabella, taken with his contrition, decides she wants to marry Julio, phony prince or not. So, two happy couples are united...though the King of Spain does not share their joy, since he is effectively down one heir to the throne. He swears to punish Duke Mendoza — which prompts Piraquo and Pedro to reveal the rest of the court secret: that they were the pirates who kidnapped the infant Carlo...who is actually Don Manuel. Happy ending.

The play's "extraordinary complexity of plot" has been noted by critics; Arthur Nason maintained that "Rarely among the complicated plots of Shirley is the complication at once more elaborate and more finely knit...Shirley, in The Court Secret, shows his greatest mastery."

== Sources ==
- Forsythe, Robert Stanley. The Relations of Shirley's Plays to the Elizabethan Drama. New York, Columbia University Press, 1914.
- Howarth, R. G. "A Manuscript of James Shirley's The Court Secret," Review of English Studies 7 (1931), pp. 302–13.
- Milling, Jane, and Peter Thomson, eds. The Cambridge History of British Theatre, Vol. 1. Cambridge, Cambridge University Press, 2004.
- Nason, Arthur Huntington. James Shirley, Dramatist: A Biographical and Critical Study. New York, 1915; reprinted New York, Benjamin Blom, 1967.
- Randall, Dale B. J. Winter Fruit: English Drama 1642–1660. Lexington, KY, University Press of Kentucky, 1996.
