= The Country Captain =

Play written by William Cavendish, 1st Duke of Newcastle

The Country Captain, alternatively known as Captain Underwit, is a Caroline era stage play written by William Cavendish, 1st Duke of Newcastle, and first published in 1649. It has attracted critical attention primarily for the question of James Shirley's participation in its authorship.

== Date and performance ==
The play's date of authorship and its performance history are not known in detail; it was performed at the Blackfriars Theatre by the King's Men, and is plausibly dated to c. 1639–40.

The Country Captain was revived early in the Restoration period. Samuel Pepys saw it performed on 21 October 1661. In his Diary he called it "so silly a play as in all my life I never saw" – though this negative verdict did not prevent Pepys from seeing the play again on 25 November that year, on 14 August 1667 and on 14 May 1668.

== Texts ==
The play was first printed in a duodecimo volume that included Newcastle's play The Variety, issued by the booksellers Humphrey Moseley and Humphrey Robinson in 1649. That first edition attributes the plays only to "a person of honor," though Newcastle's authorship is stated in 17th-century sources. The Country Captain also exists in a manuscript, Harleian MS. 7650 in the collection of the British Museum; the MS. is judged to be in the hand of Edward Knight, the prompter of the King's Men. The two texts are very similar though not identical; the manuscript appears to be the original authorial version, while the printed text shows the cuts and changes that adjusted the play for stage performance.

== Authorship ==
A. H. Bullen edited the play, from the manuscript, for the second volume of his series Old English Plays (1883) – apparently unaware of the 1649 printed text. Bullen followed J. O. Halliwell-Philips in titling the play Captain Underwit, and attributed the work to James Shirley. Subsequent critics and scholars have almost universally concluded that Bullen went too far to assigning the entire play to Shirley, and have judged that Newcastle "is almost certainly the author of this comedy." But most have accepted the view that Shirley had some hand in helping Newcastle to write the play. Some have speculated a connection with a lost play by Shirley titled Look to the Lady, which was entered into the Stationers' Register on 11 March 1640 but never published – "Look to the Lady" being a reasonable alternative title for the drama (see the Synopsis below).

The relationship between Cavendish and Shirley is clear from 17th-century sources. In his Athenae Oxoniensis, Anthony à Wood wrote that "our author Shirley did also much assist his generous patron William duke of Newcastle in the composition of certain plays, which the duke afterwards published." Shirley also dedicated his tragedy The Traitor to Newcastle upon its 1635 publication. The signs of Shirley's hand in The Country Captain are abundant and varied; they range from parallels of plot device and characterization to specific phrasings. For examples of the latter: The Country Captain employs the phrase "feather-footed Hours," which also occurs in two of Shirley's masques, The Triumph of Beauty and The Triumph of Peace. The line "That snorts at Spain by an instinct of Nature" can be found both in The Country Captain and in Shirley's The Bird in a Cage. A verse beginning "Come let us throw the dice," which is used as a drinking song in the play, is printed in Shirley's Poems (1646).

== Synopsis ==
Sir Richard Huntlove is an elderly aristocrat who is jealous of his beautiful and vivacious young wife. His jealousy is more valid than he realizes, for Lady Huntlove is planning an affair with a gentleman named Sir Francis Courtwell. To distance his wife from the temptations of London, Sir Richard moves his household to his country estate – along with a gaggle of followers and hangers-on, including: Lady Huntlove's otherwise-unnamed Sister; Sir Francis Courtwell and his nephew, the younger Courtwell being in love with the Sister; Captain Underwit, Sir Richard's stepson by his first wife; Engine, a "projector" or speculator; Device, a "fantastical gallant;" and Captain Sacksbury, a drunken old soldier. Captain Underwit has just received a commission in the local militia, and Captain Sacksbury is his mentor. Lady Huntlove's maid Dorothy is also present; she intends to become Mrs. Capt. Underwit.

Sir Francis arranges a meeting with Lady Huntlove; he fakes indisposition when Sir Richard goes hunting. Sir Richard returns unexpectedly and catches the two together – but Lady Huntlove manages to convince her husband that she is sleepwalking. The would-be lovers try for a second assignation: the Lady pretends to be pacing the floor with a toothache, and when her husband is asleep Dorothy slips into bed in her place and Lady Huntlove goes to Sir Francis. But the gentleman, tired of waiting, has fallen asleep. For their third attempt, Sir Francis intends to fake a riding accident while he and Sir Richard are going to London, and so return to the estate without the husband. He falls off his horse in reality, though, and injures himself seriously; and he takes this as a bad omen and turns penitent.

The younger Courtwell has better luck in courting Lady Huntlove's Sister – though at first she mocks and ridicules him, and he responds in kind. Paradoxically, the Sister is provoked by Courtwell's subsequent coolness; the two end up married. Dorothy sends a false letter to Sir Richard, indicating that she, Dorothy, is a runaway, and the daughter of a rich knight. Captain Underwit marries her in the belief that she's a good catch...and later finds out the truth.

A supply of more blatant comedy is provided by Engine, who has to feign lunacy to escape the consequences of his previous financial manipulations and swindles.

In addition to a wide range of commonalities with Shirley's plays, The Country Captain shows debts to the drama of Ben Jonson. This is unsurprising, since Newcastle was a patron and friend of Jonson, and on the basis of his plays is often included in the so-called Sons of Ben, the group of self-styled imitators of the master.

== Sources ==
- Davis, Joe Lee. The Sons of Ben: Jonsonian Comedy in Caroline England. Detroit, Wayne State University Press, 1967.
- Forsythe, Robert Stanley. The Relations of Shirley's Plays to the Elizabethan Drama. New York, Columbia University Press, 1914.
- Logan, Terence P., and Denzell S. Smith, eds. The Later Jacobean and Caroline Dramatists, Lincoln, NE, University of Nebraska Press, 1978;
- Nason, Arthur Huntington. James Shirley, Dramatist: A Biographical and Critical Study. New York, 1915; reprinted New York, Benjamin Blom, 1967.
- Perry, Henry Ten Eyck. The First Duchess of Newcastle and Her Husband as Figures in Literary History. Boston, Ginn and Co., 1918.
