= 1647 in literature =

List of years in literature	(table)
- … 1637; 1638; 1639; 1640; 1641; 1642; 1643; 1644; 1645; 1646; 1647; 1648; 1649; 1650; 1651; 1652; 1653; 1654; 1655; 1656; 1657 …
- Art; Archaeology; Architecture; Literature; Music; Philosophy; Science; +...

This article contains information about the literary events and publications of 1647.

== Events ==
- Summer – Thomas Hobbes gives up his work as mathematics tutor to the future Charles II of England because of a serious illness.
- October 6 – London authorities raid the Salisbury Court Theatre, breaking up an illicit performance of Beaumont and Fletcher's A King and No King.
- unknown date – Plagiarist Robert Baron publishes his Deorum Dona, a masque, and Gripus and Hegio, a pastoral, which draws heavily on the poems of Edmund Waller and John Webster's The Duchess of Malfi. The masque claims to have been performed before "Flaminius and Clorinda, King and Queen of Cyprus, at their regal palace in Nicosia," a fantasy with no relation to the actual history of Cyprus.

== New books ==
=== Prose ===
- René Descartes – Les Principes de la philosophie (French version of original Latin)
- Antonio Enríquez Gómez – El siglo pitagórico. La vida de don Gregorio Guadaña
- Baltasar Gracián – Oráculo manual y arte de prudencia
- Johannes Hevelius – Selenographia
- John Lilburne – Rash Oaths
- John Lilly – Christian Astrology
- Thomas May – The History of the Parliament of England
- Adam Olearius – Beschreibung der muscowitischen und persischen Reise (Description of [his] Muscovite and Persian Journey)
- María de Zayas y Sotomayor – Desengaños amorosos. Parte segunda del sarao y entretenimiento honesto

=== Drama ===
- "Beaumont and Fletcher" – Comedies and Tragedies... (first folio collection of the plays of John Fletcher and his various collaborators)
- Antony Brewer – The Country Girl
- Marchamont Nedham (Mercurius Pragmaticus) – The Levellers Levelled, or the Independents' Conspiracy to Root Out Monarchy
- Jean Rotrou
  - Don Bertrand de Cabrère
  - Venceslas
- Samuel Sheppard – The Committee-Man Curried
- Johann Rist – Das friedewünschende Teutschland (Peace-loving Germany)
- Lope de Vega – Parte XXV de comedias

=== Poetry ===
- Abraham Cowley – The Mistress
- Henry More – Philosophical Poems
- Johan van Heemskerk – Batavische Arcadia

== Births ==
- April 1 – John Wilmot, 2nd Earl of Rochester, English poet (died 1680)
- August 12 – Johann Heinrich Acker, German religious historian writing in Latin (died 1719)
- November 18 – Pierre Bayle French encyclopedist (died 1706)
- Unknown dates
  - Henry Aldrich, English theologian and philosopher (died 1710)
  - Petter Dass, Norwegian poet (died 1707)
  - Glückel of Hameln, German diarist (died 1727)

== Deaths ==
- January 29 – Francis Meres, English miscellanist and cleric (born 1565)
- April – Ephraim Pagit, English writer on comparative religion (born c. 1575)
- May 21 – Pieter Corneliszoon Hooft, Dutch historian, poet and dramatist (born 1581)
- June 12 – Thomas Farnaby, English classicist and cleric (born c. 1575)
