= Pleasure Reconciled to Virtue =

Play written by Ben Jonson

Pleasure Reconciled to Virtue is a Jacobean era masque, written by Ben Jonson and designed by Inigo Jones. It was first performed on Twelfth Night, 6 January 1618, in the Banqueting House at Whitehall Palace. The work's failure on its initial performance, and its subsequent revision, marked a significant development in Jonson's evolving masque technique.

== Prince Charles ==
The masque marked the début of the young Prince Charles, the future King Charles I, in the public life of the Stuart Court. Upon the death of his older brother Prince Henry in 1612, Charles had become the heir to the throne of his father, James I; but his youth and relatively poor health (he'd suffered from rickets as a child) kept Charles from assuming the kind of public prominence that Henry had earlier enjoyed. Dancing a role in Pleasure Reconciled to Virtue marked a sort of "coming out" for Charles, just as Henry's appearance in the Jonson/Jones masque Oberon, the Faery Prince (1611) had been significant in his career. Orazio Busino, the chaplain to the Venetian ambassador to London, Piero Contarini, and a member of the audience, described Charles as "an agile youth, handsome and very graceful."

== The show ==
Jonson's text for the masque was dominated by the usual figures of classical mythology – in this case, Hercules faces a conflict between the competing demands of duty and pleasure; under the guidance of Mercury, a mean between the two is found in the person of Daedalus. The appearance of Comus, the Bacchus-like god of festivity and mockery, at the start of the masque may have later inspired John Milton to make the figure a central focus of his own masque Comus in 1634. Jones's set for the masque featured a large mountain meant to represent Mount Atlas; the mountain's peak was shaped like a human head that moved its eyes and changed expression. The anti-masque featured a dozen followers of Comus, men dressed in barrels, and a dozen boys costumed as frogs. A second anti-masque featured a dance of pygmies.

Gerard Herbert mentions the silver costumes and that Anne of Denmark was unwell and did not attend. Orazio Busino's eyewitness account of the masque's initial performance helps to explain its failure. Busino wrote that toward the end of the masque the performers' energies flagged:

Finally they danced the Spanish dance once more with their ladies and because they were tired began to lag; and the King, who is by nature choleric, grew impatient and shouted loudly, "Why don't they dance? What did you make me come here for? Devil take all of you, dance!" At once the Marquis of Buckingham, his majesty's favorite minion, sprang forward, and danced a number of high and very tiny capers with such grace and lightness that he made everyone love him, and also managed to calm the rage of his angry lord.

The Marquis of Buckingham mentioned by Busino was George Villiers, who was the successor of John Ramsay and Robert Carr as the King's "favorite minion." In one interpretation, the masque may have failed with James because it was too obviously critical of the King's personal vices — "his excessive fondness for Buckingham, upon whom he lavished titles, wealth and sexual favours; his frequent inebriation; and his squandering of court revenues on over-lavish banqueting and drink."

== Revision ==
The difficulties of the masque's creators were compounded by the fact that James's queen and Charles's mother, Anne of Denmark, who had missed the first performance due to illness, commanded a second, which occurred on Shrove Tuesday, 17 February. Jonson did a major rewrite on his text, adding a new anti-masque as its start called For the Honor of Wales, full of broad dialect humour. This revision was apparently not enough to please the naysayers among the courtly audience. Busino, for his part, disapproved of the bare-breasted costumes of some of the female masquers. But the anti-masque, which Jonson had invented in The Masque of Queens in 1609, became more prominent in Jonson's subsequent works in the genre, often opening the masque as in For the Honor of Wales. Other writers of masques were influenced in the same direction, as in The Triumph of Beauty by James Shirley (published 1646).

== Aftermath ==
The career of neither Jonson nor Jones was severely impacted by the failure of Pleasure Reconciled. Jonson continued as the Court's primary author of masques for more than a decade, and Jones designed the masques for an even longer period. When the Whitehall Banqueting House burned down in January 1619, Jones replaced it with a building that is widely considered his masterpiece in architecture (see: Banqueting House, Whitehall).

Jonson's text for the masque was first published in the second folio of his collected works in 1641. That text ends with the claim that the masque "pleased the King so well, as he would see it again"— one of the more outrageous fabrications in English literature. (Jonson had died in 1637, and can't be blamed for it.) The text also exists in a transcript by the professional scribe Ralph Crane, which was prepared for Sir Dudley Carleton.

== Sources ==
- Bradley, Jesse Franklin, and Joseph Quincy Adams. The Jonson Allusion Book: A Collection of Allusions to Ben Jonson from 1597 to 1700. New Haven, Yale University Press, 1922.
- Cummings, Robert Mackill. Seventeenth-Century Poetry: An Annotated Anthology. London, Blackwell, 2000.
- Leapman, Michael. Inigo: The Troubled Life of Inigo Jones, Architect of the English Renaissance. London, Headline Book Publishing, 2003.
- Mueller, Janel M., and David Loewenstein, eds. The Cambridge History of Early Modern English Literature. Cambridge, Cambridge University Press, 2002.
- Orgel, Stephen. Ben Jonson: The Complete Masques. New Haven, Yale University Press, 1969.
- Smith, Mark Michael. Hearing History: A Reader. Athens, GA, University of Georgia Press, 2004.
