= Zelmane =

Zelmane may refer to:

- Zelmane, a 1705 play by William Mountfort, known as the first recorded use of the phrase "Be still my beating heart"
- Zelmane; or, the Corinthian Queen, a 1705 play by Mary Pix
- Zelmane the Amazon, a character in the 1640 play The Arcadia by James Shirley
- Zelmane the Amazon, a character in 1593 epic prose work The Countess of Pembroke's Arcadia by Sir Philip Sidney.
