= The Duke's Mistress =

1630s play by James Shirley

The Duke's Mistress is a Caroline era stage play, a tragicomedy written by James Shirley and first published in 1638. It was the last of Shirley's plays produced before the major break in his career: with the closing of the London theatres due to bubonic plague in May 1636, Shirley left England for Ireland, where he worked under John Ogilby at the Werburgh Street Theatre in Dublin for four years.

The Duke's Mistress was licensed for performance by Sir Henry Herbert, the Master of the Revels, on 18 January 1636, and was acted by Queen Henrietta's Men at the Cockpit Theatre. On 22 February 1636 it was performed at St. James's Palace before the King and Queen, Charles I and Henrietta Maria.

The play was entered into the Stationers' Register on 13 March 1638 and was published in quarto later that year, printed by John Norton for the booksellers Andrew Crooke and William Cooke, the partners who issued many of Shirley's plays in that era. Surviving copies of the quarto differ in identification of the publishers; some copies name Crooke alone, while others mention only Cooke.

The play shares some clear similarities with contemporaneous works like The Queen and Concubine by Richard Brome and A Wife for a Month by John Fletcher. Shirley's use of the idea of men who are attracted to ugly women has provoked commentary on the psychological and other aspects of such a fixation.

== Synopsis ==
The Duke's Mistress employs the three-level plot structure that Shirley favors through much of his output. In the main plot, Dionisio Farnese, the Duke of Parma, tries to dismiss his faithful wife Euphemia and win Ardelia as his mistress. The secondary plot reverses the main plot situation: Leontio, Farnese's kinsman and heir, loves the Duchess, and plans to murder the Duke and take his place. In the comic subplot, Horatio woos Ardelia's waiting-woman Fiametta, only to abandon her to pursue another; Horatio has an obsession with homely women – the homelier they are, the more strongly he is attracted to them.

The play opens with a celebration in Ardelia's favor – which is interrupted by Duchess Euphemia, who melodramatically begs her husband to put her to death now that she has lost his affection. A crucial misunderstanding occurs when Ardelia, not having heard the Duchess's plea and being ignorant of its nature, tells the Duke that he should fulfill the Duchess's request, whatever it is. The Duchess vows revenge on her husband and Ardelia. Farnese incarcerates his wife, and places his heir Leontio in charge of her; he already suspects Leontio's attraction for her.

In the midst of this, Bentivolio, Ardelia's fiancé, returns to the Duke's court after an absence. He accuses Ardelia of betrayal of their engagement. When the Duke arrives, Ardelia hides Bentivolio, and while he listens from hiding she manipulates Farnese into an admission that she has not yet submitted to him sexually. But a courtier named Valerio knows the situation of Bentivolio and Ardelia, and threatens to expose Bentivolio to the Duke's anger unless Ardelia sleeps with him, Valerio. Playing for time, Ardelia arranges a meeting with Valerio.

Leontio has bribed Pallante, a captain, to assassinate the Duke. Valerio overhears their plot, and joins their conspiracy. He also prevails upon Bentivolio to kill the Duke, assuring him that the new Duke, Leontio, will offer a pardon.

In her chamber, Ardelia resists Valerio, and when he tries to rape her she draws a pistol on him. Bentivolio arrives; Valerio, thinking the Duke has come, hides behind a tapestry. Bentivolio, likewise mistaking the man behind the arras, runs him through with his sword (as Hamlet does to Polonius in Hamlet, III, iv). Thinking he has killed the Duke, Bentivolio flees with Ardelia.

Pallante comes to Leontio, telling him that he has killed Farnese, who repented of his crimes and sins before he died. Then Bentivolio and Ardelia are brought in, apprehended by the guards; and Bentivolio too admits to having killed the Duke. Leontio opportunistically sends the lovers to prison for the crime, thus throwing suspicion from himself and his henchman. Leontio rushes to the Duchess, to stake his claim to Farnese's wife as well as his dukedom – but the still-living Farnese is with her. Pallante lied about the Duke's death, but told the truth about Farnese's repentance – for that is what caused the assassin to spare his victim's life. Believing the Duke is dead, Leontio mistakes Farnese for one of his own servants; Leontio carelessly tells Euphemia that Farnese's death leaves her free for him. Euphemia rejects Leontio, and Farnese kills him. The Duke and Duchess reconcile, and Bentivolio and Ardelia marry.

== Sources ==
- Clark, Ira. Professional Playwrights: Massinger, Ford, Shirley, and Brome. Lexington, KY, University Press of Kentucky, 1992.
- Forsythe, Robert Stanley. The Relations of Shirley's Plays to the Elizabethan Drama. New York, Columbia University Press, 1914.
- Nason, Arthur Huntington. James Shirley, Dramatist: A Biographical and Critical Study. New York, 1915; reprinted New York, Benjamin Blom, 1967.
