= The Politician =

1655 play by James Shirley

The Politician is a Caroline era stage play, a tragedy written by James Shirley, and first published in 1655.

== Publication ==
The Politician, along with another Shirley play, The Gentleman of Venice, was published by the bookseller Humphrey Moseley in 1655 in alternative quarto and octavo formats. The quarto was a solo-play edition; the octavo paired The Politician with The Gentleman of Venice, in an edition meant to match the Shirley collection titled Six New Plays that Moseley had issued two years earlier, in 1653. Buyers could have had the two new plays bound together with the earlier collection if they so chose.

== Date ==
The play is thought to date from c. 1639, though firm information of its stage history is lacking; it may have been staged in Dublin, where the author was working at the Werburgh Street Theatre in the later 1630s, before it appeared in London. No license from the Master of the Revels has been found for The Politician, though the May 26 1641 license for The Politic Father, an otherwise-unknown play, may apply to it. The title page of the first edition states that the play was acted by Queen Henrietta's Men at the Salisbury Court Theatre, the venue that the company occupied in the 1637–42 period.

== Sources ==
According to 17th-century commentator Gerard Langbaine, Shirley's source for his plot was the tale of the King of Romania, the prince Antissus, and his mother-in-law, from the Urania of the Countess of Montgomery (1621). Thomas Killigrew borrowed plot elements from The Politician for his tragedy The Pilgrim.

== Synopsis ==
The play possesses a highly unusual (for Shirley) setting in Norway. Gotharus is an ambitious political operator, determined to control the Norwegian throne. He sows distrust between the King and his son and heir Prince Turgesius, using forged letters indicating that the Prince covets the throne. He arranges that both Turgesius and the Prince's granduncle Duke Olaus are sent on a distant military expedition, planning that the Prince will not survive. Next Gotharus manipulates a wedding between the debauched King and the widow Marpisa, who is Gotharus's mistress; his goal is to place Marpisa's son Haraldus on the throne. Haraldus, however, proves too naive to be a willing tool, and Turgesius is marching home after a notable victory; Gotharus decides to assassinate the Prince and to have Haraldus seduced to make him more malleable.

But his plans misfire: Haraldus is distressed to learn that his mother is Gotharus's mistress; when Gotharus's minions get Haraldus drunk, he dies of a fever. The rumored assassination of the Prince provokes rebellion among the people and the army; with the rebels at the gates, Marpisa turns against her lover. Gotharus hides in a coffin prepared for Turgesius; the mob finds the coffin and carries it out to bury it with honors. On their way, the people encounter Duke Olaus and the still-living Prince; the intended assassin proved a loyal subject. The opened coffin reveals Gotharus, dead. Marpisa appears, bragging that she has poisoned Gotharus, blaming him for the death of her son; she dies from the same poison herself as the assembled crowd watches. The King offers to abdicate in penance for his faults, but Turgesius supports the restoration of his father, and announces his plan to marry Albina, Gotharus's virtuous widow.

The serious action of the main plot is varied and counterpointed by comic material with the characters Sueno and Helga.

== Critical response ==
Arthur Nason called The Politician "reminiscent of both Hamlet and of Macbeth," though without the "profound psychology of a Shakespearian masterpiece. It impresses one rather for its swift, tense scenes, its gloom, its horror." "Particularly in the closing act...the ferocity of the erstwhile timorous Marpisa approaches to magnificence." Felix Schelling, however, complained that the "wicked characters" die while the virtuous survive, resulting in "only half a tragedy" in which "moral struggle has been replaced by intrigue and counter-intrigue."

== General sources ==
- Forsythe, Robert Stanley. The Relations of Shirley's Plays to the Elizabethan Drama. New York: Columbia University Press, 1914.
- Nason, Arthur Huntington. James Shirley, Dramatist: A Biographical and Critical Study. New York, 1915; reprinted New York: Benjamin Blom, 1967.
- Schelling, Felix Emmanuel. Elizabethan Drama 1558–1642. Two volumes. Boston: Houghton Mifflin, 1908.
- Sharpe, Kevin M., and Steven N. Zwicker, eds. Reading, Society, and Politics in Early Modern England. Cambridge: Cambridge University Press, 2003.
