= The Imposture =

Play by James Shirley

The Imposture is a Caroline era stage play, a tragicomedy written by James Shirley and first published in 1652. Shirley himself considered The Imposture the best of his romantic comedies.

The Imposture was licensed for performance (as The Imposter) by Sir Henry Herbert, the Master of the Revels, on 10 November 1640. It was acted at the Blackfriars Theatre by the King's Men, the company for which Shirley wrote in the 1640–2 era.

The play was published by booksellers Humphrey Moseley and Humphrey Robinson in the octavo collection of Shirley's works titled Six New Plays (1653). In that edition, the Prologue of the play states that Shirley "has been stranger long to the English scene" — referring to Shirley's stay in Dublin at the Werburgh Street Theatre from 1636 to 1640. This may indicate that The Imposture was the first of Shirley's plays acted after his return from Ireland. Shirley dedicated the play to Sir Robert Bolles.

== Synopsis ==
Flaviano is the courtly favorite of the Duke of Mantua; he desires to marry the Duke's daughter Fioretta. She, however, has been promised to Prince Leonato of Ferrara, who has brought his army to the aid of Mantua in its current war. Honorio, the Duke's son and Fioretta's brother, favors Leonato; while he lies wounded, Flaviano schemes to persuade the Duke that Leonato is a wild young man who is morally unfit to be Fioretta's husband. Flaviano manipulates the situation so that Fioretta is moved to a convent, from where he spirits her secretly to his mother's country house. He also puts out word that Fioretta has decided to remain at the convent for a year, effectively postponing the marriage.

Prince Leonato is outraged, and blames the Duke for bad faith; he demands a face-to-face meeting with Fioretta. The Duke feels that he cannot deny this demand — but he and Flaviano plan to substitute another woman in the meeting. One of the novices at the content is Flaviano's former mistress Juliana; Flaviano prevails upon her to take Fioretta's part. He even wants Juliana to marry Leonato — but the Duke will not go that far; Juliana is merely to insist upon the one-year delay.

Prince Leonato arrives at the convent, and has his meeting with the false Fioretta. Juliana, superficially, plays her part as instructed; yet Leonato correctly interprets her replies to indicate that she would not object if he forced the issue. Taking the hint, Leonato leads a troop of his men to break into the convent and carry off "Fioretta." He takes her home to Ferrara...where the true Fioretta has also arrived. Suspicious of Flaviano, Fioretta has escaped from his mother's country house and reached Ferrara in disguise, where she has taken an assumed name and is staying with Leonato's sister Donabella. Honorio has also come to Ferrara, to seek justice and vengeance for what he thinks is the rape of his sister. As he and Leonato are prepared to duel, Juliana and Donabella rush between them. Honorio confronts his pretended sister, but Juliana manages to persuade him to remain silent for the time being.

The real Fioretta locates and welcomes her brother, while Juliana confronts Prince Leonato. She tells the prince that she is a noble virgin forced to impersonate Fioretta by the Duke of Mantua. Honorio breaks in with a captive Flaviano; Flaviano has followed Honorio to Ferrara to kill him, but has gotten caught instead. Honorio tries to explain Flaviano's villainous manipulations — but Leonato refuses to listen; he believes Juliana, and has resolved both to marry her and to go to war with Mantua.

For a moment, Flaviano's plotting appears to have worked; but he is betrayed by a co-conspirator named Claudio. Juliana's falsehood is exposed; she begs for mercy, but Leonato casts her aside. The Duke of Mantua himself arrives in Ferrara, and the Fioretta/Juliana tangle is exposed and unraveled. Leonato is matched with Fioretta, and Honorio with Donabella; Juliana is sent back to the convent, and Flaviano is exiled.

The play's subplot involves the courting of the widow Florelia by the soldiers Hortensio and Volterino. Florelia says that she will marry the man who cures her son Bertoldi of his cowardice. The soldiers, with a share of soldierly drinking and brawling, try to make Bertoldi brave, and failing that, to make him appear brave; but that fails too. Eventually making the best of a bad job, Florelia marries Hortensio.
