= The Gentleman of Venice =

Play by James Shirley

The Gentleman of Venice is a Caroline era stage play, a tragicomedy written by James Shirley, and first published in 1655.

The play was licensed for performance in London by Sir Henry Herbert, the Master of the Revels, on 30 October 1639. It was acted by Queen Henrietta's Men at the Cockpit Theatre in that year, though Shirley himself still seems to have been in Ireland at the time. It is possible, however, that the play was performed earlier at the Werburgh Street Theatre in Dublin, where Shirley worked as producer/director and house dramatist in the later 1630s.

In 1655, The Gentleman of Venice was published twice in alternative quarto and octavo formats by the bookseller Humphrey Moseley, who issued the play both as a solo work and bound together with Shirley's The Politician. (Moseley issued the octavo edition so that owners of his 1653 octavo collection Six New Plays could have the two newly printed works bound together with the earlier texts if they so desired.) These publications were unusual in that the lists of dramatis personae were furnished with short descriptions of each of the important characters, an atypical feature in the printing of plays at that time. In The Gentleman of Venice, for example, Florelli is described as "Of a noble extraction and person, much honoured for his parts, by which he gained much reputation in the academies."

== Synopsis ==
Giovanni is the son of the gardener to the Duke of Venice; though a commoner of the humblest station, he is a serious young man of admirable character – which attracts the attention of Bellaura, the Duke's niece. Giovanni decides to serve as a soldier in Venice's war with Genoa; Bellaura equips him with armor and with a letter of introduction to the military commander, who is her relative. Giovanni distinguishes himself notably in the campaign – so much so that the Duke tells him to name his own reward. With great hesitation, the courageous Giovanni asks for the hand of Bellaura in marriage. But the proud young lady refuses him, and Giovanni returns to his gardening.

At the same time, the Duke's son Thomazo has been convicted of high treason. The court is astonished when his old nurse Ursula, Giovanni's mother, pleads for a pardon for him, announcing that Thomazo is really her son, while Giovanni is the rightful heir of Venice. Ursula had switched the two as infants. Giovanni is recognized and accepted as the Duke's son; he and Bellaura are married.

In the subplot, Cornari is a wealthy gentleman of Venice (the play's title derives from this subplot) who laments the childlessness of his marriage with his wife Claudiana. He is determined that his debauched nephew Malipiero shall not inherit the Cornari estate. So Cornari abducts an English gentleman called Florelli, a man of virtue and valor, and imprisons the kidnapped man in his palace. Cornari's goal is that Florelli will impregnate Claudiana.

When Cornari thinks this has been accomplished, he plans to have Florelli killed; before doing so, Cornari masquerades as a priest and hears Florelli's confession – which convinces him that his wife has kept her virtue and no impregnation has taken place. In fact, Florelli and Claudiana spent their time together praying for Cornari. Ashamed and repentant, Cornari abandons his scheme and releases Florelli. (Florelli is tossed into the street with a bag over his head; the experience leaves him distracted. He determines, firstly, to get drunk, and secondly, to leave Venice.) Cornari's nephew Malipiero, however, is arrested for participating in Thomazo's treasonous plot, and eventually comes to a sincere reformation of his ways, making him suitable as his uncle's heir.

Critic Arthur Nason called the play's comic scenes "worthy of Restoration comedy at its best."

== Sources ==
- Forsythe, Robert Stanley. The Relations of Shirley's Plays to the Elizabethan Drama. New York, Columbia University Press, 1914.
- Hoenselaars, A. J. Images of Englishmen as Foreigners in the Drama of Shakespeare and His Contemporaries. Rutherford, NJ, Fairleigh Dickinson University Press, 1992.
- Nason, Arthur Huntington. James Shirley, Dramatist: A Biographical and Critical Study. New York, 1915, reprinted New York, Benjamin Blom, 1967.
- Sharpe, Kevin M., and Steven N. Zwicker, eds. Reading, Society, and Politics in Early Modern England. Cambridge, Cambridge University Press, 2003.
