= 1652 in literature =

| List of years in literature | (table) |
- … 1642; 1643; 1644; 1645; 1646; 1647; 1648; 1649; 1650; 1651; 1652; 1653; 1654; 1655; 1656; 1657; 1658; 1659; 1660; 1661; 1662 …
- Art; Archaeology; Architecture; Literature; Music; Philosophy; Science; +...

This article contains information about the literary events and publications of 1652.

== Events ==
- March/April – John Milton loses the last of his eyesight during the year.
- unknown date – A translation by Saiyid Aidarus of the Arabic religious poem "Hamziya" is the earliest known written example of Swahili literature.

== New books ==
=== Prose ===
- Anonymous – Eliza's Babes, or the Virgin's Offering
- Elias Ashmole – Theatrum Chemicum Britannicum.
- Nicholas Culpepper – The English Physitian, or, An astrologo-physical discourse on the vulgar herbs of this nation, being a compleat method of physick, whereby a man may preserve his body in health, or cure himself, being sick (later known as The Complete Herbal)
- Owen Feltham – Brief Character of the Low Countries
- Antonio Rocco – L'Alcibiade, fanciullo a scola (Alcibiades the schoolboy)
- Thomas Urquhart – The Jewel (Ekskybalauron): a vindication of the honor of Scotland
- Henry Vaughan – Mount of Olives
- Thomas Vaughan (philosopher) (Eugenius Philalethes) – The Fame and Confession of the Fraternity of R:C:
- Gerrard Winstanley – The Law of Freedom

=== Drama ===
- Anonymous – The Bastard
- Richard Brome – A Jovial Crew
- Francis Goldsmith – Sophompaneas, or Joseph (a translation of Hugo Grotius's tragedy)
- Thomas Middleton – The Widow
- John Tatham – The Scots Figgaries
- Pedro Calderon de la Barca – La fiera, el rayo y la piedra
- Agustín Moreto
  - San Franco de Siena
  - El parecido en la corte
- Luis Velez de Guevara – Reinar después de morir
- François le Métel de Boisrobert – Les Trois Orontes

=== Poetry ===
- Edward Benlowes – Theophilia or Love's Sacrifice
- Richard Crashaw – Deo Nostro Te Decet Hymnus
- Antonio Enríquez Gómez – Sansón Nazareno
- Francisco de Trillo y Figueroa – Poesías varias, heroicas, satíricas y amorosas

== Births ==
- March 2 – Thomas Otway, English dramatist (died 1685)
- April 13 – Thomas Ward, English Catholic writer (died 1708)
- May – Jane Barker, English poet and dramatist (died 1732)
- Unknown date – Nahum Tate, Irish poet and dramatist (died 1715)

== Deaths ==
- February 28 – Arcangela Tarabotti, Venetian nun and feminist writer (born 1604)
- April 12 – John Vicars, English contemporary biographer, poet and polemicist of the English Civil War (born 1582)
- May – Claude de L'Estoile, French playwright and poet (born 1602)
- May 5 – Mary (née Powell), English wife of John Milton (born 1625)
- June 25 – Abraham von Franckenberg, German mystic, poet, and hymn writer (born 1593)
- August 14 – Abraham Elzevir, Dutch printer, proprietor of the House of Elzevir (born 1592)
- October – Arthur Wilson, English playwright, historian, and poet (born 1595)
- October 8 – John Greaves, English antiquary (born 1602)
- October 20 – Antonio Coello, Spanish dramatist and poet (born 1611)
- November 29 – Francesco Angeloni, Italian historian, novelist, dramatist and collector (born 1587)
- December 2 – Christopher Elderfield, English theologian (born 1607)
- December 23 – John Cotton, English-born American theologian and minister (born 1585)
