= The Traitor (play) =

Play written by James Shirley

The Traitor is a Caroline era stage play, a tragedy written by James Shirley. Along with The Cardinal, The Traitor is widely considered to represent the finest of Shirley's efforts in the genre, and to be among the best tragedies of its period. "It is impossible to find a more successful drama of its type than Shirley's Traitor."

The Traitor was licensed for performance by Sir Henry Herbert, the Master of the Revels, on 4 May 1631, and was acted by Queen Henrietta's Men at the Cockpit Theatre. The play was entered in the Stationers' Register on 30 November 1634, and published in 1635 by the printer William Cooke, with a dedication by Shirley to William Cavendish, 1st Duke of Newcastle.

In creating the character of Sciarrha, Shirley may have been influenced by Foreste in Sir William Davenant's The Cruel Brother (1627). Shirley's source for the play's subplot was the account of the murder of Buondelmonte in Le istoire fiorentine by Niccolò Machiavelli.

The play was revived during the Restoration era, in November 1660. King Charles II saw a public performance on 10 October 1661, a performance witnessed by Samuel Pepys. An adaptation of The Traitor was published in 1692, under its original title, but with the authorship credited to a "Mr. Rivers." The play was revived twice in the early 18th century, once in 1703–1704 and again in 1718. The latter version, printed anonymously in 1718 as The Traitor, is attributed to Christopher Bullock, and contains a number of alterations from the original. In 1819, Richard Lalor Sheil produced an adaptation of The Traitor called Evadne, which was popular in both England and the United States.

== Synopsis ==
The protagonist of the play is Lorenzo, a character based on the historical figure Lorenzino de' Medici, cousin and favorite of Alessandro de' Medici, Duke of Florence. Because of his political ambition to supplant the Duke, Lorenzo sets up his own faction and begins two plots. One is to frustrate the fortunes of his rival Cosmo by impeding his marriage to the wealthy Oriana; the second is to bring down the Duke by embroiling him in a quarrel with the violent nobleman Sciarrha.

At first, Lorenzo's schemes bear fruit. He defends himself successfully against accusations of conspiracy; and he encourages the Duke to take Sciarrha's sister Amidea as his lover, and incites Sciarrha's ire in response. When Sciarrha tells his sister that he plans to kill the Duke, Amidea prevails upon him to let her deal with their problem. The Duke comes to Amidea's apartments, not realizing that Sciarrha is hidden behind the arras of her bedchamber. Amidea tries to appeal to the Duke, but he is determined to have her; before he can force her to submit, Amidea draws a poniard, wounds her own arm, and threatens to kill herself. This forces to Duke to back down and turn penitent. Sciarrha emerges from hiding, admits he planned to kill the Duke, and tries to enlighten him as to Lorenzo's plotting. The Duke hides behind the tapestries to overhear Sciarrha's talk with Lorenzo. Lorenzo, however, is too crafty to fall into Sciarrha's trap, and feigns ignorance of the matter and pretends to call for the Duke's guards. The Duke decides to treat the matter as a misunderstanding, and has the two men reconcile.

Though one of his plots is frustrated, Lorenzo has better luck with his other scheme. Cosmo, fearful of Lorenzo as the Duke's favorite, surrenders his interest in Oriana to another nobleman, Pisano; Pisano, in turn, breaks his engagement with Amidea and wins the consent of Oriana's mother. Lorenzo manipulates Sciarrha's anger at Pisano's treatment of Amidea; Sciarrha kills Pisano on the morning of his marriage, and Lorenzo sets him up to murder the Duke as well. Sciarrha tells Amidea that she will have to yield to the Duke, if he does not kill her; playing for time, Amidea suggests that she will satisfy the Duke – and Sciarrha stabs her. Dying, she confesses that she was not serious in what she'd said.

Sciarrha places his sister's body in her bed; the Duke enters, kisses the corpse, and realizes that she is dead. As he raises an alarm, Lorenzo and a confederate enter and stab the Duke. Sciarrha enters, and Lorenzo and Sciarrha fight and kill each other.

The play's element of comic relief is supplied by the character Depazzi.

== Sources ==
- Carter, John Stuart, ed. (1965). James Shirley: The Traitor. Lincoln, NE: University of Nebraska Press. ISBN 978-0-8032-0282-5.
- Harbage, Alfred (1940). "Elizabethan–Restoration Palimpsest". Modern Language Review. 35 (3): 287–319. doi:10.2307/3716627. JSTOR 3716627.
- Logan, Terence P.; Smith, Denzell S., eds. (1978). The Later Jacobean and Caroline Dramatists: A Survey of Bibliography of Recent Studies in English Renaissance Drama. Lincoln, NE: University of Nebraska Press. ISBN 978-0-8032-2850-4.
- McAfee, Helen (1916). Pepys on the Restoration Stage. New Haven: Yale University Press.
- Nason, Arthur Huntington (1915). James Shirley, Dramatist: A Biographical and Critical Study. New York: Arthur H. Nason.
- Nicoll, Allardyce (1929). A History Of Early Eighteenth Century Drama, 1700-1750 (2nd ed.). Cambridge: Cambridge University Press.
- Schelling, Felix Emmanuel (1908). Elizabethan Drama 1558–1642. Boston: Houghton Mifflin.
