= The Doubtful Heir =

Play by James Shirley

The Doubtful Heir, also known as Rosania, or Love's Victory, is a Caroline era stage play, a tragicomedy written by James Shirley and first published in 1652. The play has been described as "swift of action, exciting of episode, fertile of surprise, and genuinely poetic."

The play dates from the Irish phase of Shirley's dramatic career (1636–40), and was acted at the Werburgh Street Theatre, most likely in 1638, under its alternative Rosania title. After Shirley's return to London (April 1640), the play was licensed for performance by Sir Henry Herbert, the Master of the Revels, still as Rosania (June 1, 1640), and was performed at the Globe Theatre by the King's Men. (In the play's Prologue, Shirley comments on how "vast" the stage of the Globe is, compared to the small private theatre in Dublin where the work premiered.) The title was changed by the time the play was included in a general list of works belonging to the King's Men (1641).

The play was published first as a single copy in 1652. The title page indicated that this was its first time in print and that it has been acted at the Blackfriars theater. It was issued by the booksellers Humphrey Moseley and Humphrey Robinson, who then included it in the octavo volume Six New Plays, in 1653. The play is dedicated by Shirley to Sir Edmund Bowier, probably Bowyer, who had also been at Cambridge.

For the plot of his play, Shirley exploited Tirso de Molina's El Castigo del Penséque, a source he had previously employed for his The Opportunity. The play's Fletcherian aspects have been noted, with special emphasis on A King and No King and Philaster.

== Synopsis ==
Olivia, the Queen of Murcia, is engaged to marry Leonario, the prince of Aragon. The wedding plans are disrupted by an invasion: Ferdinand claims to be the Queen's cousin and the rightful heir to the throne. Leonario leads an army against the pretender and brings him back a captive. Ferdinand is accompanied by his page, Tiberio — who is actually Ferdinand's fiancée Rosania in disguise. On trial for treason, Ferdinand courageously maintains his claim to the throne. Olivia is impressed with him, falls in love with him, and commands a recess in the trial as she leaves the courtroom. Leonario and the nobles are prepared to sentence the apparent usurper, but the Queen prevents and reproves them. She states that investigation may yet validate Ferdinand's claim, and has him escort her from the court, to the general consternation of her supporters.

Olivia soon marries Ferdinand — but finds him neglectful, and becomes irate and jealous. She questions "Tiberio" about potential mistresses; when Ferdinand arrives, Olivia tries to provoke his jealousy by flirting with Tiberio/Rosania, and then leaves them together. Ferdinand confesses that he agreed to the wedding only to allow a chance for them to escape, and has avoided consummation of the marriage. Rosania is willing to leave Ferdinand to Olivia, but Fredinand will not accept this; he prevails on "Tiberio" to obey the Queen's summons to her chamber, and to leave the resolution of the problem in his hands. While Olivia is courting "Tiberio," Fredinand barges into her suite with courtiers in an effort to expose her. Olivia, however, brazens out her predicament, while her maid is in the next room disguising "Tiberio" as a woman. As the confrontation between Olivia and Ferdinand is coming to a head, one of Leonario's spies drops a bombshell: the page is in fact a woman, and Ferdinand's fiancée.

Back in jail, Ferdinand awaits execution. Suddenly, though, he is acknowledged and acclaimed as the rightful king by the chancellor and other nobles. It was the chancellor who rescued Ferdinand from a ruthless uncle during infancy and enabled his escape. Ferdinand becomes king in his own right, and publicly recognizes Rosania as his future queen; Olivia's unsullied honor leaves her a fit mate for Leonario. But Leonario has a plan of his own: in a surprise attack he and his forces take the palace and capture the new King and his court. Ferdinand is condemned to death yet again, and Leonario leads Olivia to the altar; yet the victorious army's general rips off his false beard to reveal himself as Ferdinand's old guardian and Rosania's father. The army that appeared to back Leonario is in fact a force from Valencia sent to reinforce Ferdinand. The rightful King Ferdinand and his new Queen Rosania triumph in the end.
