= 1655 in literature =

This article contains information about the literary events and publications of 1655.

== Events ==
- February 24 – The English playwright Thomas Porter abducts his future bride Anne Blount.
- March 26 – The playwright Thomas Porter kills a soldier named Thomas Salkeld in Covent Garden, probably in a duel, is consequently tried for murder, pleads guilty to manslaughter, is allowed benefit of clergy, and is sentenced to be burned in the hand.
- May–October – Church of England clergyman Jeremy Taylor is imprisoned at Chepstow Castle for an injudicious preface to his popular manual of devotion, Golden Grove; or a Manuall of daily prayers and letanies, published this year.
- August 6 – The Blackfriars Theatre in London is demolished.
- October 29 – To celebrate Lord Mayor's Day, Edmund Gayton's pageant Charity Triumphant or the Virgin Show is staged in London; it is the first City pageant in fifteen years.

== New books ==
=== Prose ===
- John Bramhall – Defense of True Liberty (Anglican divine begins exchange of treatises with Thomas Hobbes)
- Margaret Cavendish, Duchess of Newcastle – The World's Olio
- Nicholas Culpeper – Astrological Judgement of Diseases from the Decumbiture of the Sick
- Richard Flecknoe - Relation of Ten Years' Travels in Europe, Asia, Affrique, and America
- Thomas Fuller – The Church History of Britain
- John Heydon – Eugenius Theodidacticus
- Michel Millot and Jean L'Ange (attributed) – L'Escole des filles
- William Prynne
  - A New Discovery of Free-State Tyranny
  - The Quakers Unmasked
- Thomas Stanley – History of Philosophy
- John Wallis – Elenchus geomeiriae Hobbianae (attack on the works of Thomas Hobbes)
- Izaak Walton – The Compleat Angler (2nd edition)
- Baltasar Gracián – El comulgatorio
- Francisco de Quevedo – Política de Dios y gobierno de Cristo (second part)
- Diego de Saavedra Fajardo – Juicio de artes y ciencias

=== Drama ===
- Antony Brewer – The Lovesick King
- Lodowick Carlell – The Passionate Lovers, Parts 1 and 2
- Robert Daborne – The Poor Man's Comfort
- Robert Davenport – King John and Matilda
- Thomas Heywood and William Rowley – Fortune by Land and Sea
- Philip Massinger – Three New Plays, a collection that included The Guardian, The Bashful Lover, and (with John Fletcher) A Very Woman
- James Shirley
  - The Gentleman of Venice
  - The Politician
- Jeremy Taylor – Golden Grove; or a Manuall of daily prayers and letanies

=== Poetry ===
- Henry Vaughan – Silex Scintillans (part 2)

== Births ==
- January 1 – Christian Thomasius, German philosopher (died 1728)
- February 7 – Jean-François Regnard, French dramatist and diarist (died 1709)
- February 28 – Johann Beer, Austrian author, court official and composer (died 1700)
- c. November – Jacob Tonson, English bookseller and publisher (died 1736)
- unknown date – Lin Yining (林以寧), Chinese poet (died c. 1730)

== Deaths ==
- February 25 – Daniel Heinsius, Dutch poet (born 1580)
- May 8 – Edward Winslow, English theologian, pamphleteer and New England politician (born 1595)
- July 28 – Cyrano de Bergerac, French dramatist (born 1619)
- September 7 – François Tristan l'Hermite, French dramatist (born c. 1601)
- October 24 – Pierre Gassendi, French philosopher (born 1592)
- probable – John Reynolds, English poet, story-writer and pamphleteer (born c. 1588)
