= The Triumph of Beauty =

Masque by James Shirley (1646)

The Triumph of Beauty is a Caroline era masque, written by James Shirley and first published in 1646. The masque shows a strong influence of Shakespeare's A Midsummer Night's Dream.

The plot of the masque draws upon one of the most famous tales of Greek mythology, the Judgement of Paris; Shirley derives some material from the Dialogues of Lucian. (Shirley had previously used the same subject matter in the masque in Act V of his 1640 play The Constant Maid.) The cast includes all the principals of the story, with the divinities occurring in their Roman versions: Paris, Juno, Venus, and Pallas all appear, along with Mercury, Cupid, Hymen, the Graces, the Hours, and a personified Delight. (The three Hours, Eunomia, Dike and Eirene, also appear in Shirley's The Triumph of Peace.) The figures of the anti-masque are seven shepherds, Bottle, Crab, Clout, Toadstool, Shrub, Scrip, and Hobbinoll; as a group they resemble the comic Athenians in Shakespeare's Dream, with Bottle as Shirley's version of Bottom. The scene is set at Mount Ida, in keeping with the traditional story; the masque ends with Venus's victory in the contest of beauty, and makes no mention of the ensuing events (that is, the Trojan War).

The text of the masque was first published in the octavo volume of Shirley's Poems that was issued in 1646 by the bookseller Humphrey Moseley. The masque was also, apparently, sometimes bound and sold as a separate volume.

After the London theatres closed in 1642 at the start of the English Civil War, Shirley made his living as a schoolteacher, and created his final dramatic works for student performance. His late works Honoria and Mammon, The Contention of Ajax and Ulysses, and Cupid and Death fall into this category. The 1646 title page of The Triumph of Beauty states that the masque "was personated by some young Gentlemen, for whom it was intended, at a private Recreation." Judging by its publication date, The Triumph of Beauty may have been the earliest of these pedagogic dramas. The music for the masque was composed by William Lawes, who also composed the music for Shirley's The Triumph of Peace.

== Sources ==
- Forsythe, Robert Stanley. The Relations of Shirley's Plays to the Elizabethan Drama. New York, Columbia University Press, 1914.
- Greg, W. W. A List of Masques, Pageants, &c., Supplementary to A List of English Plays. London, Bibliographical Society/Blades, East and Blades, 1902.
- Logan, Terence P., and Denzell S. Smith, eds. The Later Jacobean and Caroline Dramatists: A Survey and Bibliography of Recent Studies in English Renaissance Drama. Lincoln, NE, University of Nebraska Press, 1978.
- Walls, Peter. Music in the English Court Masque, 1604–1640. Oxford, Clarendon Press, 1996.
