= Saint Patrick for Ireland =

Play by James Shirley

- Original language: English
- Written by: James Shirley
- Characters: Leogarius; St. Patrick; Victor; Archimagus; Queen; Jupiter and Mars (statues)
- Genre: Neo-miracle play
- Setting: Ireland, 5th century

Premiere
- Date: Autumn 1639
- Place: Werburgh Street Theatre, Dublin

Saint Patrick for Ireland is a Caroline era stage play, written by James Shirley and first published in 1640. It is notable as an early development in Irish theatre.

The play was written and performed during Shirley's stay in Dublin in the years 1637–40. Shirley, one of the most prominent and successful London playwrights of the previous decade, moved to Dublin during the long closure of the London theatres, from May 1636 to October 1637, due to an epidemic of bubonic plague. St. Patrick for Ireland was clearly written specifically for Shirley's new Dublin audience; it was performed in the autumn of 1639, at the Werburgh Street Theatre in Dublin, "the first Irish playhouse." There is no record of a London performance in Shirley's era...or later.

The play was entered into the Stationers' Register on 28 April 1640 and was issued later that year in an octavo volume, printed by J. Raworth for the bookseller Robert Whitaker. In both the Prologue and Epilogue to the 1640 printed text, Shirley promises to continue the story of St. Patrick in a second part to the play – which apparently was never written. Because of this, however, the existing play is sometimes referred to as Part 1, or 1 St. Patrick for Ireland. The play was reissued in 1657 in London, in a quarto that it shared with Shirley's The Constant Maid. The play was next reprinted in Dublin in 1751, when William Rufus Chetwood included it in A Select Collection of Old Plays.

The play's genre has been described as "neo-miracle," an updated version of the miracle or mystery play that typified Medieval theatre. Shirley applied his knowledge of the stage devices of the London stage to tell a story rich in Christian miracle lore. (One critic has speculated that the proposed second part of the play would have dealt with "St. Patrick's Purgatory," an Irish place of pilgrimage.) Shirley's primary source for historical data on his subject was the biography of the saint by Abbot Jocelyn of Furness (c. 1185). The play's apparent pro-British-imperial political implications provoked a response, in Landgartha, a drama composed by the Dublin lawyer Henry Burnell and staged on 17 March 1640. One of the dedicatory verses to that play criticizes dramatists who employ "flames and fire / Tempests and whirlwinds" to tell their stories – a reference to the effects in Shirley's play.

== Synopsis ==
At the start of the play, the Irish Druids are up in arms, and soldiers are manning all the ports, in response to a prophecy of St. Patrick's arrival and his coming success in converting Ireland to Christianity. The King, Leogarius, has been having nightmare visions of the coming campaign against him. But of course, St. Patrick's arrival is not the military-style campaign that the King fears; the saint comes with a group of priests – and his guardian angel, Victor. Leogarius tries to poison Patrick, but fails; a servant drinks the poison and dies, but is brought back to life by Patrick (a miracle that converts Leogarius's queen). In another instance, two men disguise themselves as the statues of Jupiter and Mars in a pagan temple (Shirley conflates the Druids with Roman mythology), and when the King is present the statues move and speak and demand the blood of Patrick. After the ceremony is done, the masqueraders descend from their pedestals, and as a reward are allowed to "dance" with the Queen's daughters. In the final confrontation, the Druid Archimagus summons up poisonous snakes to kill the sleeping Patrick; but the saint providentially wakes in time and dispels the snakes from the entire island. The Archimagus is swallowed by the earth. The King converts to Christianity as a result – though Patrick mistrusts the firmness of his change of heart (a reservation that leaves an opening for a continuation of the story).

Forsythe notes significant parallels in structure and characterization with the Dekker/Massinger play The Virgin Martyr, among other works of the era.
