= Cupid and Death =

Play by James Shirley

Cupid and Death is a mid-seventeenth-century masque, written by the Caroline era dramatist James Shirley, and performed on 26 March 1653 before the Portuguese ambassador to Great Britain. The work and its performance provide a point of contradiction to the standard view that the England of Oliver Cromwell and the Interregnum was uniformly hostile to stage drama.

== Background ==
After the closure of the theatres in 1642 at the start of the English Civil War, Shirley earned a living as a schoolteacher. As part of his new occupation, he wrote dramas – morality plays and masques – for his students to perform. The final works of his career, including Honoria and Mammon and The Contention of Ajax and Ulysses (both published in 1659), were works for student performers. Cupid and Death is another work in this category, though its resemblances with the great masques of the late Stuart Court have been noted by critics – it "is much more like a Court Masque than any of Shirley's other school Masques". Perhaps this aspect of the work made it seem appropriate for the Portuguese ambassador, the Count of Peneguiaõ. Shirley's past Royalist connections with the Stuart Court, and even his Roman Catholicism, clearly (if surprisingly) did not stand as insuperable obstacles to a public staging of the work.

== Publication ==
Cupid and Death was first published in quarto in 1653, by the booksellers John Crook and John Baker. It was reprinted in 1659. The full musical score for the masque, by Matthew Locke and Christopher Gibbons, has survived, and was published together with Shirley's text in a modern edition in 1951.

== Sources ==
The drama depends on a traditional tale, found in Aesop and many subsequent versions. For his source, Shirley employed a 1651 translation of Aesop by John Ogilby, with whom he'd worked at the Werburgh Street Theatre in the later 1630s. Shirley wrote commendatory verses for Ogilby's volume.

== Plot ==
In the tale and in Shirley's retelling, Death and Cupid accidentally exchange their arrows and cause chaos as a result. Cupid shoots potential lovers and inadvertently kills them. Death shoots at elderly people whose time of passing has come, and strikes them ardent instead; he shoots duellists about to fight, and they drop their swords to embrace and dance and sing. The "serious" portion of the masque features the kind of personifications standard in the masque form: Nature, Folly, Madness, and Despair. As usual in masques of Shirley's era, the work contains a comic anti-masque, with a tavern Host and a Chamberlain, and a dance of "Satyrs and Apes." (The poor Chamberlain is struck by Death with Cupid's arrow, and falls in love with an ape.) The god Mercury eventually intervenes to set things right; Cupid is banished from the courts of princes to common people's cottages (a suitably sober moral for the Puritan regime then in power). The slain lovers are shown rejoicing in Elysium.

"Cupid and Death resembles Caroline masque in its use of staging, music, dance, singing and dialogue. Yet it differs in that the masquers take part in the action and they do not dance with the audience at the end...The balance between spoken prose dialogue, recitative and song carries the performance away from masque and towards opera, a form Davenant planned to introduce to the London stage as early as 1639."

Cupid and Death was performed at Rutland Boughton's Glastonbury Festival in 1919, by the Consorte of Musicke (notably Anthony Rooley and Emma Kirkby) in 1985, and by the Halastó Kórus (directed by Göttinger Pál) in Budapest in 2008.

== Sources ==
- Clare, Janet. Drama of the English Republic, 1649–60. Manchester, Manchester University Press, 2006.
- Corns, Thomas N. A History of Seventeenth-Century English Literature. London, Blackwell, 2007.
- Logan, Terence P., and Denzell S. Smith, eds. The Later Jacobean and Caroline Dramatists: A Survey and Bibliography of Recent Studies in English Renaissance Drama. Lincoln, NE, University of Nebraska Press, 1978.
- Rose, Martial. Forever Juliet, Dereham, Norfolk, Larks Press, 2003.
