= The Sisters (play) =

1642 play by James Shirley

The Sisters is a Caroline stage play, a comedy written by James Shirley. It was the last of Shirley's plays performed in London prior to the closing of the theatres in September 1642, at the start of the English Civil War. "Slight in substance, The Sisters is excellent in matter of technique, and especially in...structural unity...."

== Date, performance, publication ==
The play was licensed for performance by Sir Henry Herbert, the Master of the Revels, on 26 April 1642 and acted by the King's Men at the Blackfriars Theatre later in the year. The play was first printed in an octavo volume with five other Shirley dramas, published by Humphrey Moseley and Humphrey Robinson in 1653 and titled Six New Plays. In that volume, the play is dedicated to William Paulet, esq., and is preceded by verses written by Shirley in praise of Shakespeare, Fletcher, and Jonson.

== The prompt book ==
The play was revived in the Restoration era by Sir Thomas Killigrew and his King's Company, c. 1668–70. The copy of the play that served as the production's prompt book has survived, in the collection of Sion College. It is a copy of the 1653 Six New Plays, though only the text of The Sisters was annotated by Charles Booth, the King's Company prompter. The annotations reveal specific details of the revival production's staging (including music cues and the prompter's whistle signals for scenery changes), and mention fifteen members of the company by name, including Nell Gwyn and Margaret Hughes.

== Synopsis ==
The play is set in the northern Italian city-state of Parma, which is under the rule of Prince Farnese. Paulina and Angellina are the two noble sisters of the title, the nieces of Antonio. Paulina, proud and extravagant, is determined to marry the prince; Angellina is her temperamental opposite, gentle, modest, eager to become a nun. Antonio wishes to moderate the extremes of both young women's characters, and convert them into a balanced gentility. Paulina's marital ambition has lately been confirmed by some wandering astrologers — who are actually a group of bandits in disguise, led by Frapolo. He and his band return to Antonio's castle, now disguised as Prince Farnese and his court. Paulina is completely fooled, and prepares to leave with Frapolo and with all her jewels and plate.

The real Prince Farnese arrives, however, motivated partly to witness Paulina's extravagant vanity, and partly to arrange a marriage between Angellina and one of his courtiers, Lord Contarini. Instead, Farnese falls in love with Angellina himself — but she refuses him, since she has fallen in love with Vergerio, Lord Contarini's page. When Angellina makes her feelings known, a surprise is in store for all involved — though no one familiar with the conventions of English Renaissance comedy will be astonished to learn that Vergerio is a lady in disguise. She is Pulcheria, the daughter of the Viceroy of Sicily and Lord Contarini's former love. (Contarini believes she's dead.) Contarini is delighted to have her back; and Angellina decides to accept the prince's offer or marriage.

Frapolo tries to brave out his disguise; when this fails, he admits his deception. Paulina's pride takes a mighty tumble: not only does she lose the prince to her sister, but her nurse reveals that Paulina is her own daughter, and not Angellina's sister at all. The false prince Frapolo and the false gentlewoman Paulina end up as husband and wife.
