= The Bird in a Cage =

Play by James Shirley

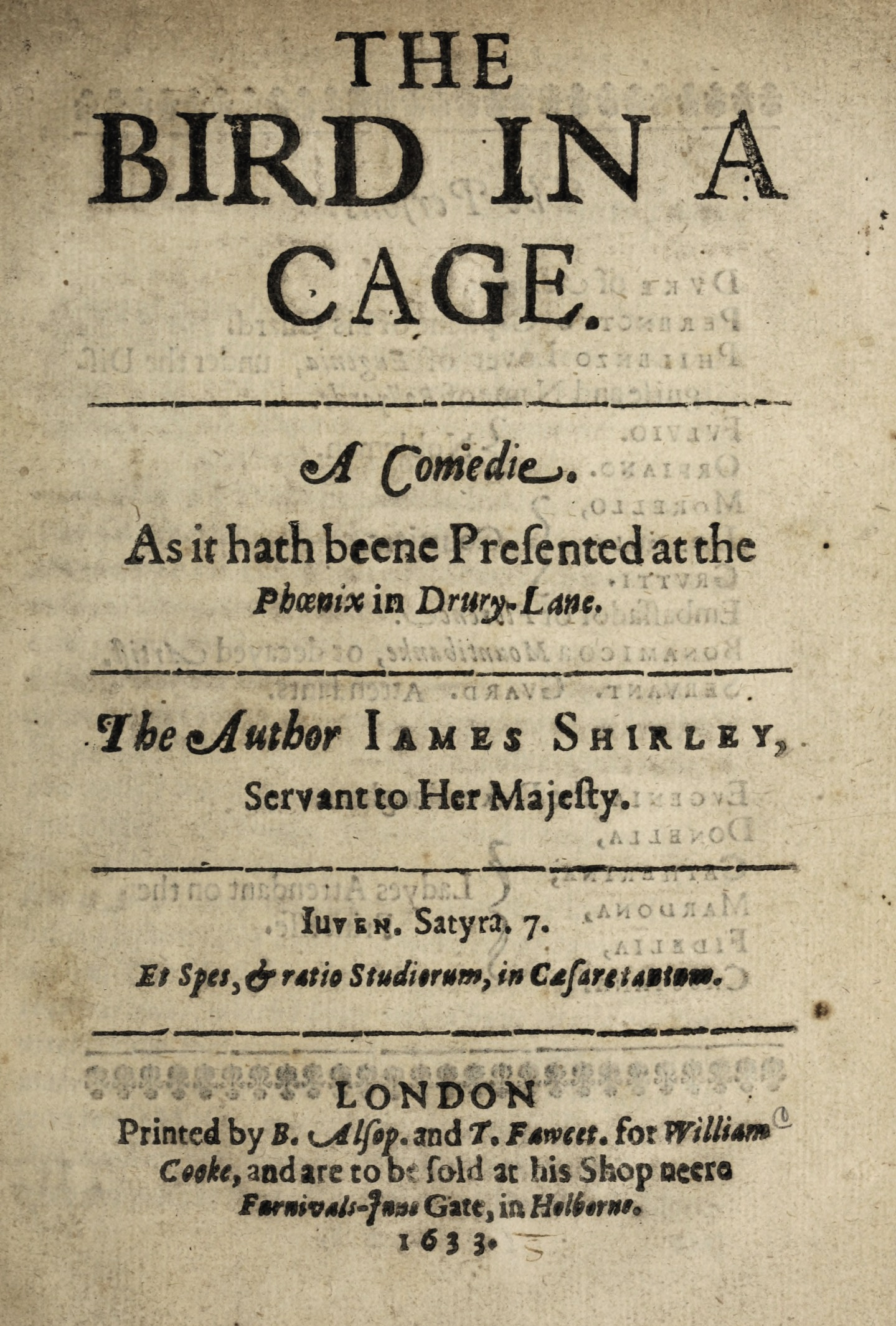
Title page of the first edition of The Bird in a Cage (1633)

The Bird in a Cage, or The Beauties is a Caroline era comedy written by James Shirley, first published in 1633. The play is notable, even among Shirley's plays, for its lushness — what one critic has called "gay romanticism run mad."

== History ==
The play was licensed for performance, under the title The Beauties, by Sir Henry Herbert, the Master of the Revels, on 21 January 1633. It was published in quarto in the same year, printed by B. Alsop and T. Fawcet for the bookseller William Cooke. The title page of the 1633 quarto states that the play was acted at the Phoenix, or Cockpit Theatre, which means it was played by Queen Henrietta's Men, as was standard for Shirley plays of that time. The play was ironically dedicated to William Prynne, the Puritan author and religious controversialist who published his wide-ranging attack on stage drama and actors, Histriomastix, in the previous year, 1632. Among other things, Histriomastix was perceived as an attack on Queen Henrietta Maria; Shirley's satirical dedication was seen as a defence of the Queen, and may have influenced the Inns of Court to select Shirley as the author of their masque, The Triumph of Peace, which was staged early in 1634.

== Women onstage ==
The Bird in a Cage also has some bearing on the question of women onstage. Women did not act on public stages prior to the Restoration; but aristocratic women did appear and dance in masques. And in January 1633, the Queen and her ladies had performed speaking parts in Walter Montagu's masque The Shepherd's Paradise. The Bird in a Cage includes a masque about Jupiter and Danaë, performed by Eugenia and her waiting women in their confinement. (In the early productions, all the female roles were filled by boy actors.) This would have been another dig at Prynne, who was particularly incensed about sexuality and perceived immorality on the stage, in various aspects — boys dressing as women, women appearing in masques, etc.

== Sources ==
Critics have noted the relationship between Shirley's play and a work in the canon of John Fletcher. "The Bird in a Cage involves extensive reworking of Fletcher's earlier play of wagers and incarceration, Women Pleased."

== Synopsis ==
The Duke of Mantua plans to marry off his daughter Eugenia to the ruler of Florence; to do so, he shuts Eugenia in a tower and banishes her noble suitor Philenzo. But Philenzo returns in disguise, and brags to the court that he can succeed in any task the Duke assigns him — if the Duke grants him the financial resources necessary. The Duke (in the best fairy-tale tradition), sets Philenzo the task of gaining access to the princess Eugenia in her sequestered tower; the Duke considers the matter as something of a joke, but also a good opportunity to test the soundness of his security. Philenzo is allowed a month for the task, and a blank check on the Duke's treasure house. And of course, the penalty for failure is death.

Philenzo tries bribes, which do not work. Facing the apparent failure of his effort, Philenzo decides that he can at least relieve the poor debtors in the Duke's dungeons. One of the debtors, however, provides Philenzo with a new strategy for reaching the princess. The Duke in presented with a large and elaborate cage full of rare birds; and the Duke sends the present to Eugenia. When she opens it, Philenzo steps out from concealment in the central pillar of the apparatus. Thus the title of the play applies to both Eugenia and Philenzo (as it does, in another sense, to the dedicatee, the imprisoned Prynne).

The next day the still-disguised Philenzo informs the Duke that he has succeeded in his task. Eugenia, brought to the court for confirmation, supports Philenzo's claim — and asks that she be allowed to marry the clever stranger. The Duke is outraged at her request; to marry a stranger of no birth is worse than marrying Philenzo. Philenzo doffs his disguise, revealing his true identity; but the unyielding Duke orders him executed. Seemingly in the knick of time, a letter arrives from the Duke of Florence, who has heard of the matter of Eugenia and Philenzo and renounces any interest in the arranged match. Florence's letter advises Mantua to let the young lovers marry, and Mantua decides to make the best of a bad bargain. When Philenzo in summoned back, however, it is learned that the condemned man poisoned himself on the way to execution; his corpse is brought in as proof. When the "dead" Philenzo overhears that he and Eugenia were to be allowed to marry, he returns to life.
