= The Constant Maid =

Stage play by James Shirley

The Constant Maid, or Love Will Find Out the Way is a Caroline era stage play, a comedy written by James Shirley and first published in 1640.

The play is associated with the Irish phase of Shirley's dramatic career (1637–40), and was likely performed in Dublin at the Werburgh Street Theatre. One scholar, however, has produced evidence that The Constant Maid was originally composed in the early 1630s.

The Constant Maid was never licensed for performance by the Master of the Revels, as it normally would have been, if staged in London. The play could hardly have been performed in London in its existing form, since the scene of the mock-king (see below) would never have made it past the censorship of the Master, Sir Henry Herbert.

The play was entered into the Stationers' Register on 28 April 1640, along with Shirley's St. Patrick for Ireland, and was published later that year in a quarto printed by J. Raworth for the bookseller Robert Whitaker. In 1657 the play was reissued, in a quarto along with the St. Patrick play, by the bookseller Joshua Kirton. And in 1661 The Constant Maid was reprinted, under its subtitle, and attributed to "T. B."; the title page states that the play was performed by Queen Henrietta's Men at the Cockpit Theatre—though the inaccuracy of the attribution renders all the assertions of the title page questionable. A fourth edition appeared in 1667 as the work of "J. S." The 1667 title page maintains that the play was "Acted at the new playhouse called the Nursery, in Hatton Garden," reflecting a Restoration revival.

== Synopsis ==
Hartwell is a gentleman who is suffering financial reverses; he is forced to dismiss his servants and shut up his house. Hartwell loves Frances; Frances's mother Bellamy, in order to test her prospective son-in-law's fidelity, pretends to be in love with him herself. Hartwell's friend Playfair advises him to accept the mother's advances — but their conversation is overheard by Frances's Nurse. The Nurse, who wishes Frances to marry a clownish suitor called Startup, arranges for Frances and Startup to eavesdrop on the conversation between Hartwell and Bellamy. The Nurse conspires with Close, a dismissed servant of Hartwell's who now works for Startup, to smuggle Startup into Frances's bedroom that night; but Close, loyal to his former employer, divulges the plan to Hartwell.

Hartwell disguises himself as Startup, and the Nurse unknowingly leads him to Frances's room. Frances recognizes him, but pretends to believe that Hartwell is Startup, and pretends likewise to be receptive to his suit. Bellamy interrupts their conversation and Hartwell leaves, with the mistaken impression that Frances loves Startup. Bellamy, testing her daughter's affections, tells Frances to surrender Hartwell to her.

While Hartwell has taken Startup's place, Close has scared away the real Startup by claiming that Hartwell is pursuing him. Close and Startup and Hartwell are all apprehended by the constables of the watch; Hartwell is suspected of doing away with Startup, until Startup appears. The muddle is eventually straightened out, as is Hartwell's understanding with Frances.

In the subplot, Playfair is in love with the niece of Hornet the usurer. She feigns madness and is treated by a doctor who is Playfair's cousin. Hornet is tricked into going to Court, where he is granted an audience with a pretended King; meanwhile the niece is spirited away from her uncle's custody and is married to Playfair.

Like many plays of its era (including several of Shirley's), the final act of The Constant Maid features a masque — in this case a representation of the Judgement of Paris. (Shirley would write an entire independent masque on the same subject, in his The Triumph of Beauty.)
