= The Brothers (Shirley play) =

Play by James Shirley

The Brothers is a Caroline era stage play, a comedy written by James Shirley. First published in 1652, The Brothers has sometimes been hailed as one of Shirley's best plays, though it has also been a focus of significant confusion and scholarly debate.

"There is much uncertainty about this play" — though much of this uncertainty seems unnecessary, given the historical facts. The Brothers was licensed for performance by Sir Henry Herbert, the Master of the Revels, on 4 November 1626. The title page of the first edition indicates that the play was acted by the King's Men. Some scholars have assumed that Shirley wrote for the King's Men only in the final phase of his career, in 1640–42; but this is by no means a certainty. Shirley's long and productive connection with Queen Henrietta's Men dominated most of his career, though he wrote Love in a Maze for the King's Revels Men in 1632.

The eccentric nineteenth-century critic F. G. Fleay originated the argument that the play that was published as The Brothers in 1653 is a revision of an otherwise-unknown play by Shirley titled The Politic Father, which was licensed by the Master of the Revels on 26 May 1641. This argument was accepted by Arthur Nason. Other critics have regarded The Politic Father as an alternative title for Shirley's extant tragedy The Politician, for which there is no license in Herbert's records, and have treated the Brothers = Politic Father argument as tendentious and overly elaborate. "The fact of the matter seems to be that The Brothers of 1652 is The Brothers of 1626," writes Forsythe. Schelling also supports this view. Occam's razor certainly appears to cut their way.

The play was printed in the octavo volume titled Six New Plays, issued by the booksellers Humphrey Moseley and Humphrey Robinson in 1653. (Five of the dramas in Six New Plays, including The Brothers, are dated to 1652, while the sixth, and the general title page, are dated to 1653, leading to a confusion in dating.) In that volume, The Brothers is dedicated to Thomas Stanley.

The Brothers was revived early in the Restoration era; it was acted in July 1662.

== Synopsis ==
Though set in Madrid, the play is "purely a comedy of English manners." It tells the story of a tyrannical father eager for his daughter to marry into money. He pursues one suitor after another for her, only to be fooled in the end.

Fernando and Francisco, the brothers of the title, are in love with Felisarda and Jacinta, the niece and daughter of Don Carlos. But the Don will not favor Francisco, a second son with no patrimony, for his daughter; and so, to fool the old man, the brothers pretend to love the other brother's love. Don Carlos's son Luys comes home from the university with a friend named Alberto, a potential suitor for Jacinta's hand; and the Don favors the young student. The brothers' father Don Ramyres, ignorant of his sons' affections, suggests his elder son Fernando as a match for Jacinta, and Don Carlos prefers him over Alberto because he's richer; but then Fernando is displaced in Don Carlos's good graces by Don Pedro, an even wealthier candidate.

Fernando tells his father of his love for the penniless Felisarda, and Don Ramyres pretends to disinherit him. Their romance revealed, Felisarda is sent away from her uncle's house to stay with Don Ramyres's household. Don Ramyres pretends to die, leaving Francisco as his heir and Fernando with only a meagre pension. Jacinta is to by married to the rich Don Pedro, a fool and braggart—but she disguises Don Pedro's cast-off love Estefania in her clothes and sends Estefania off to the church in her place. Jacinta then elopes with Francisco.

At Luys's instigation, Alberto abducts the woman he thinks is Jacinta (actually Estefania) on her way to the marriage ceremony. Finding that he's been fooled and that Jacinta has eloped, the flexible Alberto marries Estefania (he's a more attractive match for her than Don Pedro). Don Carlos, confronted with the fact of a new son-in-law, takes rueful comfort in the idea that at least Francisco is an heir; Francisco, however, offers his patrimony to his older brother—who refuses it. The supposedly dead Don Ramyres suddenly re-appears, to announce that he's merely been testing his sons; and he blesses the marriages of both young men.

As is usually the case with Caroline era plays, The Brothers shows links and commonalities with various earlier works; Forsythe cites Webster's The Devil's Law Case, Jonson's The Staple of News, the Beaumont/Fletcher play The Maid's Tragedy, and The London Prodigal, among others.
