= 1653 in literature =

This article contains information about the literary events and publications of 1653.

== Events ==
- January 17 – John Evelyn begins to set out gardens at Sayes Court, Deptford, the house he has recently bought.
- March 26 – James Shirley's masque Cupid and Death is performed before the Portuguese ambassador in London.
- June – English actor Robert Cox is arrested at the Red Bull Theatre in London for performing a "droll" deemed to be a play (prohibited during the English Interregnum).
- September 9 – London publisher Humphrey Moseley enters into the Stationers' Register the plays The History of Cardenio (1613), attributed posthumously to William Shakespeare and John Fletcher, and Henry I (1624) and Henry II, attributed to Shakespeare and Robert Davenport; none survive.
- Pastor Daniel Klein's Grammatica Litvanica, the first printed prescriptive grammar of the Lithuanian language, is published in Latin by Johann Reusner in Königsberg, Duchy of Prussia, introducing the distinctive Lithuanian letter Ė.

== New books ==
=== Prose ===
- Ralph Austen – A Treatise on Fruit-trees, showing the manner of grafting, setting, pruning, and ordering of them in all respects
- Baltasar Gracián – El criticón (second part)
- Blaise Pascal – Traité du triangle arithmétique
- Jeremy Taylor – Twenty-five Sermons
- Sir Thomas Urquhart
  - First English translation of Rabelais' Gargantua and Pantagruel, Books I and II
  - Logopandecteision
- Izaak Walton -The Compleat Angler
- Arthur Wilson – The History of Great Britain, being the Life and Reign of King James I

=== Drama ===
- Richard Brome – Five New Plays, a collection of his dramas including A Mad Couple Well-Match'd, The Novella, The Court Beggar, The City Wit, and The Damoiselle
- John Ford (attributed) – The Queen (published)
- William Heminges – The Fatal Contract (published)
- Henry Killigrew – Pallantus and Eudora (published; Killigrew's revision of his own The Conspiracy, 1638)
- Philippe Quinault – Les Rivales
- James Shirley – The Court Secret (published)
- Lope de Vega – La discreta enamorada
- Agustín Moreto – El lindo don Diego
- Paul Scarron – Don Japhel d'Arménie

=== Poetry ===
- Margaret Cavendish – Poems and Fancies

== Births ==
- January 13 – Philipp Jakob Spener, German theologian (died 1705)
- March 8 – Goodwin Wharton, English autobiographer and politician (died 1704)
- Unknown date – Chikamatsu Monzaemon (近松 門左衛門), Japanese dramatist (died 1725)
- Probable year of birth – Nathaniel Lee, English dramatist (died 1692)

== Deaths ==
- May 26 – Robert Filmer, English political theorist (born 1558)
- July 10 – Gabriel Naudé, French librarian and scholar (born 1600)
- September 3 – Claudius Salmasius, French classical scholar (born 1588)
- September 23 – Jacques Goar, French Hellenist (born 1601)
- October 15 – Piaras Feiritéar, Irish-language poet and rebel (hanged; born c. 1600)
- December – John Taylor, English poet and waterman (born 1578)
- Unknown date
  - Zachary Boyd, Scottish poet (born 1585)
  - Lucrezia Marinella, Italian poet, writer and supporter of women's rights (born 1571)
