= Thomas Brewer (writer) =

English writer

Thomas Brewer (fl. 1624) was an English writer, of whose life no details are known.

== Works ==
Brewer was the author of some tracts in prose and verse.

The first was a prose tract, published as The Life and Death of the Merry Deuill of Edmonton. With the Pleasant Pranks of Smug the Smith, Sir John and mine Host of the George about the Stealing of Venison. By T.B. (1631; reprinted in 1819). The author's name, "Tho. Brewer" is inscribed on the last leaf. This piece was written and probably printed at a much earlier date, for on 5 April 1608 "a booke called the lyfe and deathe of the Merry Devill of Edmonton, &c., by T. B." was entered in the Stationers' Registers (Arber's Transcripts, iii. 374). A unique example is recorded, printed in 1657, with the name 'T. Brewer, Gent.' on the title-page. The popularity of the comedy of the Merry Devil of Edmonton doubtless suggested the title of this droll tract, which tells us little about Peter Fabell, and deals mainly with the adventures of Smug.

In 1624 Brewer published a small collection of satirical verses, under the title of A Knot of Fooles. But Fooles or Knaves or both I care not, Here they are; come laugh and spare not (second edition 1658). The stanzas to the reader are signed "Tho. Brewer"; they are followed by a dialogue between fools of various sorts. The body of the work consists of satirical couplets, under separate titles, on the vices of the day. "Pride teaching Humility", the concluding piece, is in seven-line stanzas.

Brewer's next production was a series of poems descriptive of the plague, entitled The Weeping Lady, or London like Ninivie in sack-cloth. Describing the Mappe of her owne Miserie in this time of Her heavy Visitation ... Written by T. B. (1625). The dedication to Walter Leigh, esq., and the "Epistle to the Reader" are signed "Tho. Brewer". On the title-page is a wood-cut (repeated on the verso of A 3) representing a preacher addressing a crowd from St. Paul's Cross; a scroll issuing from his mouth bears the inscription "Lorde, haue mercy on vs. Weepe, fast, and pray". Each page, both at top and bottom, has a mourning-border of deep black. The most striking part of the tract is a description of the flight of citizens from the metropolis, and of the sufferings which they underwent in their attempts to reach a place of safety.

Two other tracts by Brewer relating to the plague were published by H. Gosson in 1636: Lord have Mercy upon us. The World, a Sea, a Pest House and A Dialogue betwixt a Cittizen and a poore Countrey-man and his Wife. London Trumpet sounding into the country. When death drives the grave thrives. A copy of the last-named tract (or tracts?) was in Heber's library (Bibl. Heber. pt. viii. No. 234).

In 1637 Brewer contributed to a collection of verse, entitled The Phoenix of these late times, or the Life of Mr. Henry Welby, Esq. Lemon ascribes to Brewer a broadside by T. B. (preserved in the library of the Society of Antiquaries), entitled Mistress Turner's Repentance, who, about the poysoning of the Ho. Knight Sir Thomas Overbury, was executed the fourteenth day of November last (1615). London's Triumph 1656, by T. B., a descriptive pamphlet of the lord mayor's show for that year, is probably by Brewer. He has commendatory verses in Taylor's Works (1630), and in Heywood's Exemplary Lives ... of Nine the most worthy Women of the World (1640).
