= The Arcadia (play) =

1640 play by James Shirley

The Arcadia is James Shirley's dramatization of the prose romance The Countess of Pembroke's Arcadia by Sir Philip Sidney, one expression of the enormous influence that Sidney's work exercised during the 17th century. Shirley's stage version was first published in 1640.

The 1640 quarto was published by booksellers John Williams and Francis Eglesfield. The title page attributes the play to Shirley, and states that it was acted by "her Majesty's servants" at the Phoenix playhouse which was the Cockpit Theatre. Alfred Harbage has disputed the attribution to Shirley.

The play has been characterized as "typical Fletcherian dramatic romance, slight of characterization, improbable of plot, but full of unexpected turns, and pretty sentiment, and poetic charm." Shirley scholars have disagreed on the significance of the play in the dramatist's canon. Schelling considered it an anomaly with no larger impact, while Nason thought that it represented Shirley's "complete acceptance of romanticism."

== Synopsis ==
King Basilius of Arcadia, accompanied by his queen Gynecia and their daughters Philoclea and Pamela, retire to a forest lodge in an attempt to evade the prediction of an oracle. They are pursued by the princesses' two royal suitors. Pyrocles, son and heir of the King of Macedon, is in love with Philoclea, and comes disguised as Zelmane the Amazon; his cousin Musidorus, the prince of Thessaly, is in love with Pamela, and is disguised as the shepherd Dorus. Complications ensue: Basilius falls in love with "Zelmane the Amazon," while his wife, seeing through the disguise, falls in love with the real Pyrocles. To escape this tangle, Pyrocles arranges to meet both the king and queen in a cave — but he leaves them to run into each other, while he pursues his own suit to Philoclea. Musidorus, meanwhile, wants to elope with Pamela.

King Basilius and Queen Gynecia, meeting in the cave, reconcile. The queen gives her husband the wine she brought for Pyrocles, believing it carries a love potion; instead it is poison, and Basilius "dies" after drinking it. The King's officers arrest the Queen, and the princes and princesses as well. Euarchus, the King of Macedon, sits in judgment on the case, and condemns the queen and princes to various death sentences. He discovers too late that one of the condemned is his own son; yet the sentence must be carried out. As they are being taken to execution, King Basilius returns to consciousness and sits up on his funeral bier — so fulfilling the prophecy they had all tried to escape.

The play also features a masque of shepherds, and a comic subplot featuring the characters Mopsa, Miso, and Dametas.
