= The Royal Master =

Play by James Shirley

The Royal Master is a Caroline era stage play, a comedy written by James Shirley, and first published in 1638. The play is "ranked by many critics as Shirley's ablest work in romantic comedy...It is a play notable for well-knit plot, effective scenes, pleasing characterization, clever dialogue, and poetic atmosphere."

The Royal Master was part of the Irish phase of Shirley's career (1637–40); it premiered on 1 January 1638 at the Werburgh Street Theatre in Dublin, and was likely the first of Shirley's plays produced there (according to the dedication of the first edition). It also was given in a special performance at Dublin Castle. The play was published in quarto later that year, also in Dublin, by the booksellers Edmund Crooke and Thomas Allot. (Crooke was a relation of Andrew Crooke, the London stationer who issued a series of Shirley's plays in the later 1630s.) The 1638 text is dedicated by Shirley to George Fitzgerald, 16th Earl of Kildare, and is prefaced by dedicatory poems, including one by John Ogilby, the founder of the Werburgh Street Theatre. The Epilogue extols both King Charles I and Thomas Wentworth, 1st Earl of Strafford, the Lord Deputy of Ireland and Shirley's patron.

The Royal Master was entered into the Register of the Stationers Company of London on 13 March 1638 and also licensed for London performance by Sir Henry Herbert, the Master of the Revels, on 23 April the same year.

== Synopsis ==
The play is set in the Kingdom of Naples. Montalto, the King's favourite, wants to secure his influence by marrying Theodosia, the sister of the King — which means that he must frustrate the proposed marriage of Theodosia to the Duke of Florence, the brother of the King's late queen. Montalto arranges a hunting party for the King and Duke, which pauses, by plan, at the country house of the noble widow Simphorosa. Montalto's plan is that the Duke will fall in love with Domitilla, the charming, fifteen-year-old daughter of the house. And to that extent his plan succeeds — the Florentine Duke is much taken with the young woman. Also, Montalto quietly informs the Duke that Theodosia is already privately committed to another — that being himself, Montalto.

Still, the Duke hesitates to abandon the sister of a powerful monarch. Montalto informs Theodosia of the Duke's interest in Domitilla; he also hints to Riviero, the Duke's secretary, that Theodosia has already yielded her honor — to him, Montalto. All this plotting comes to a head: the King reproaches the Duke for deserting Theodosia, the Duke complains of Theodosia's compromised honor, and Theodosia clashes with her brother and with Domitilla as well.

Montalto tries to keep the mess from reaching him. The only link that can connect Montalto with the accusation against Theodosia is the secretary, Riviero. Montalto uses his power to keep both the secretary and the Duke from the King's presence. The King calls for his favorite; concerned that the rumors about Theodosia's compromised honor are true, the King wants to find some nobleman to marry her to control a possible scandal. Montalto volunteers. The King accepts him, but has a strange plan for showing his gratitude. The King orders Montalto and all his party of supporters into custody, and encourages all and sundry to present their complaints to the supposedly "disgraced" favorite. The royal scheme is that Montalto will soon be restored to favor with all his enemies revealed. But Montalto's plot against the duke, and other crimes as well, are demonstrated, with evidence in the favorite's handwriting.

The court is amazed to find that the King still appears to favor his favorite. Montalto is brought back to the court — only to face the accusations of his villainy and to be disgraced and condemned to death. Since this is a comedy, it turns out that a man Montalto is supposed to have had murdered is in fact alive, in disguise; he is Riviero, the Duke's secretary. Montalto's death sentence is commuted to banishment. (Because of this serious undercurrent, the play is sometimes classified as a tragicomedy.)

The subplot involves Domitilla, and her infatuation with the King. The King at first plans to arrange a marriage between her and Montalto; the naive girl misunderstands him, and thinks the King has asked her to marry him. When the Duke shows his interest, she rejects him, thinking herself already committed; but this merely drives the Duke and Theodosia together. The girl's mother, Simphorosa, perceives her daughter's situation and asks the King to help resolve it. The King does so, by asking Domitilla to be not his wife but his mistress (a solicitation he makes only after he's certain she will refuse). The plan works, and Domitilla, her infatuation broken, becomes affianced to the noble young Octavio.
