= Antony Brewer =

Antony Brewer (fl. 1655) was a dramatist, author of The Love Sick King, to whom a number of other works have been attributed.

== The Love-Sick King ==
Brewer wrote The Love-sick King, an English Tragical History, with the Life and Death of Cartesmunda, the Fair Nun of Winchester, by Anth. Brewer (1655) It was revived at the King's Theatre in 1680, and reprinted in that year under the title of The Perjured Nun. William Rufus Chetwood included the Love-sick King in his Select Collection of Old Plays, published at Dublin in 1750, but made no attempt to correct the text of the carelessly printed old edition. The play was written in verse, but it is printed almost throughout as prose.

== Attribution of other works ==
After all allowance has been made for textual corruptions, it cannot be said that the Love-sick King is a work of much ability; and it is rash to follow Kirkman, Baker, and Halliwell in identifying Antony Brewer with the "T. B." whose name is on the title-page of the Country Girl (1647), a well-written comedy, which in parts (notably in the third act) closely recalls the diction and versification of Massinger. There is no known dramatist of the time to whom the initials T. B. could belong. There was a versatile writer named Thomas Brewer, and the title-pages to his tracts are usually signed with his initials, not with the full name. His claim to the Country Girl would be quite as reasonable as Antony [Tony] Brewer's. In 1677 John Leanerd, whom Langbaine calls "a confident plagiarist"', reprinted the Country Girl, with a few slight alterations, as his own, under the title of Country Innocence

Another play formerly ascribed to Brewer was Lingua, or the Combat of the Five Senses for Superiority (1607), a well-known dramatic piece (included in the various editions of Dodsley), constructed partly in the style of a morality and partly of a masque. The mistake arose thus: Kirkman, the bookseller and publisher, in printing his catalogues of plays, left blanks where the names of the writers were unknown to him. Annexed to the 'Love-sick King' was the name Antony Brewer; then came the plays Landgartha, Love's Loadstone, Lingua and Love's Dominion Phillips, who was followed by Winstanley, misunderstanding the use of Kirkman's blanks, promptly assigned all these pieces to Brewer. One other play, The Merry Devil of Edmonton (1608) has been with similar carelessness pronounced to be Antony Brewer's on the strength of an entry in the Stationers' Registry which refers to the prose tract of Thomas Brewer's Merry Devil.
