= Antonio Enríquez Gómez =

Spanish dramatist, poet and novelist

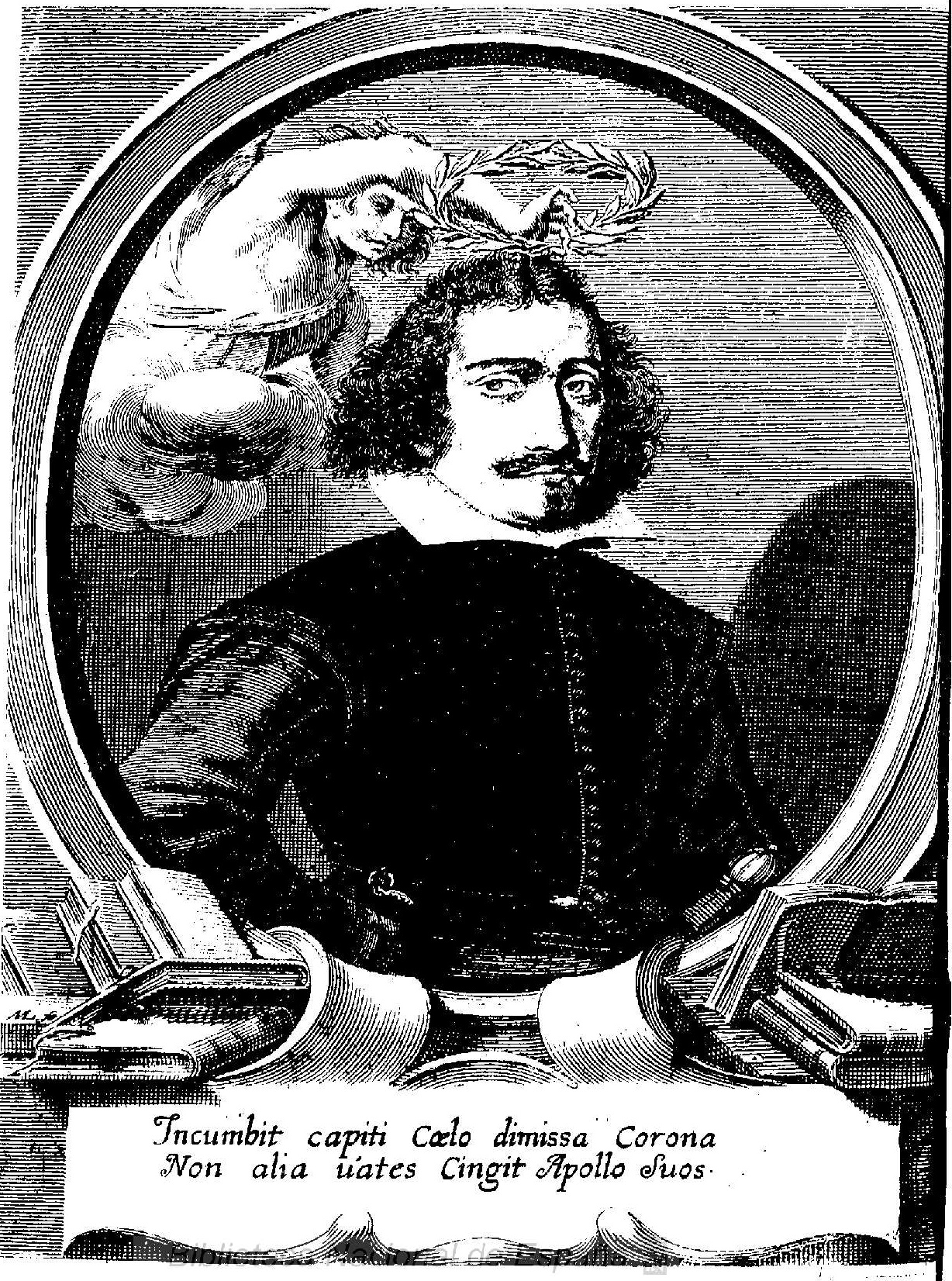
Portrait of Antonio Enríquez Gómez, illustration from "Moral Academies of the Muses", printed in Bordeaux by Pedro de la Court in 1642. Signature on the shelf, left, "ML [linked] faith."

Antonio Enríquez Gómez (Cuenca 1601 - Seville 1663), Spanish dramatist, poet and novelist of Spanish-Jewish origin, was known in the early part of his career as Enríque Enríquez de Paz. Furthermore, certain of his works feature the alternate spelling Antonio Henrique Gómez.

== Life ==
Born into a family of Conversos at Cuenca, Gómez entered the Spanish Army, where he obtained a Captaincy. Captain Gómez was suspected of Crypto-Judaism, or being, "a Marrano", and fled to France about 1636. He adopted the name Antonio Enríquez Gómez, and became major-domo to King Louis XIII, to whom he dedicated Luis dado de Dios 4 Anna (Paris, 1645).

He returned to Spain in 1649 and lived first in Alcalá, then in Granada and, from 1651, in Seville, under the false name of Fernando de Zárate. The Spanish Inquisition had Gómez burned in effigy in Toledo on January 1, 1651, and in Seville on April 1660. On September 21, 1661 his true identity was discovered and he was detained at his home in Seville by the Inquisition. He died there in his prison cell on March 19, 1663.

== Writings ==
Three of his plays, El Gran Cardenal de España, don Gil de Albornoz, and the two parts of Fernán Mendez Pinto (based on the life of the Portuguese explorer Fernão Mendes Pinto) were received with great applause at Madrid about 1629; in 1635 he contributed a sonnet to Montalbán's collection of posthumous panegyrics on Lope de Vega, to whose dramatic school Enríquez Gómez belonged. The Academias morales de las Musas, consisting of four plays (including A lo que obliga el honor, which recalls Calderón's Médico de su honra) was published at Bordeaux in 1642; La torre de Babilonia, containing the two parts of Fernán Mendez Pinto, appeared at Rouen in 1647; and in the preface to his poem, Sansón Nazareno (Rouen, 1656), Enríquez Gómez gives the titles of sixteen other plays issued, as he alleges, at Seville.

According to the Encyclopædia Britannica Eleventh Edition, "[h]is dramatic works, though effective on the stage, are disfigured by extravagant incidents and preciosity of diction. The latter defect is likewise observable in the mingled prose and verse of La culpa del primer peregrino (Rouen, 1644) and the dialogues entitled Política angélica (Rouen, 1647). Enríquez Gómez is best represented by El siglo pitagórico y vida de don Gregorio Guadana (Rouen, 1644), a striking picaresque novel in prose and verse which is still reprinted."

== Publications ==
- J. Amador de los Rios, Estudios históricos, políticos, y literarios sobre los judíos de España (Madrid, 1848)
