= The Cardinal (1641 play) =

Play written by James Shirley

The Cardinal is a tragedy by James Shirley, written in the Caroline era. It was licensed for performance by Sir Henry Herbert, the Master of the Revels, on 25 November 1641, and first published in 1652. The play belongs to the final phase of Shirley's career as a London playwright, when he was no longer serving as the house dramatist of Queen Henrietta's Men. The Cardinal was acted instead by the King's Men at the Blackfriars Theatre.

The play was also published in Six New Playes, an octavo collection of Shirley's works issued by the stationers Humphrey Moseley and Humphrey Robinson in 1653 – one of a series of Shirley collections from this era. Nineteenth-century and twentieth-century critics, including Edmund Gosse and Fredson Bowers, considered it among his finest works. Bowers called Shirley's play a "coherent Kydian revenge tragedy, polished and simplified in his best manner." It was considered to be "the first among Shirley's tragedies."

The play was revived early in the Restoration period, with an opening night at the Theatre Royal in Vere Street on 23 July 1662. The play was revived again at the Southwark Playhouse in May 2017.

== Synopsis ==
Two lords praise the qualities of the Duchess, who has just finished mourning for her lost husband; they voice their disapproval of The Cardinal's plans to marry her to his nephew, Columbo. Alphonso arrives and brings news that the Arragonians are preparing for war against them.

The Duchess asks her ladies for their opinions of the men at court. The Secretary arrives and brings news that the men are preparing for war and Columbo has been chosen as general. Columbo comes to say goodbye, and the King and Cardinal arrive to see Columbo off. The King decrees that Columbo will marry the Duchess on the day of his return. As soon as she is alone, the Duchess says that she intends to secure the promise she first made to love Alvarez, a man of the court. Alvarez comes in and the two discuss their love and plans to be with each other.

Hernando, Alphonso, and Columbo are holding a war council to discuss the lack of preparedness and training among the army. Columbo receives a letter from the Duchess asking him to release her from any contract or agreement, and becomes angry. He determines that this is just a ruse on her part to get him to come home to her faster. The Secretary returns with Columbo's response to the Duchess' letter. She does not advise what the letter contained and instructs the Secretary to take two thousand ducats from the steward. The Duchess goes to the King with a letter from Columbo, releasing her from contract to him. The King consents to let her marry Alvarez, saying he'll be a guest at their wedding. The Cardinal enters and is furious; the two argue and the Duchess resolves to marry Alvarez.

Two lords bring news that the army has triumphed is marching homeward. The secretary persuades some servants to present a play for the King and court, in celebration of the Duchess's marriage. A group of masquers pre-empt the performance, and Columbo joins in as part of the masque. The masquers get Alvarez to join in, they take him offstage to costume him, and bring him back dead. Columbo takes responsibility and produces the letter the Duchess wrote asking him to release her, which he says is proof of her attempt to discredit his name. The King refuses to pardon Columbo.

Some time has passed, and Hernando, in conversation with two lords, remarks on the King's pardoning of Columbo. The lords speak of murdering Columbo. Hernando goes off to comfort the Duchess. The King orders the Cardinal to go to the Duchess and try to reconcile her.

Columbo forces his way into the Duchess's chambers. He curses her with his revenge and says he'll kill anyone else she ever presumes to marry. Hernando arrives to entreat the Duchess to devise some revenge for Alvarez's murder, proposing himself to kill Columbo, then the Cardinal. She promises to marry him if he succeeds. The Cardinal enters as Hernando leaves, and tells the Duchess that she is being too severe in her anger over Columbo's pardon. The Duchess is convinced, and apologizes to the Cardinal. After he leaves, the Duchess says she's still angry and hopes that Hernando's plan succeeds in killing both Columbo and the Cardinal.

Hernando sets up a duel between himself and Columbo, ostensibly to avenge his honor at being dismissed from the field during battle. Before they start fighting, he announces his intent to avenge Alvarez's death. Hernando manages to wound Columbo, who forgives Hernando with his dying breath. Hernando departs immediately.

The court is abuzz with gossip about Columbo's death. Hernando is suspected of the murder since he has fled, and the Cardinal has been appointed as the Duchess's guardian. In the aftermath of all this, the Duchess has lost her wits and "turned child again". The Cardinal is furious that the Duchess has gone mad and cannot now be aware of any revenge he might have in store for her. Celinda brings the Cardinal a document that makes him happy and able to plan a dastardly revenge for the Duchess. He promises to "rifle first her darling chastity, / 'Twill be after time enough to poison her" and seek his revenge on Hernando when she is dead. Hernando, in disguise, arrives with a letter for the Duchess. The Secretary recognizes him, but pledges his loyalty, and the two discuss the Duchess's madness.

The Duchess requests Hernando's presence after receiving his letter. Celinda arrives to see the Duchess and is put off by the Secretary. She takes the opportunity to woo him in order to get a reputable father for her unborn child. The Duchess moves in and out of lucidity in conversation with Hernando, still promising to marry him, and then departs for dinner with the Cardinal. Hernando stays behind and laments her madness.

As the diners move into the chamber, Hernando hides behind an arras to observe. Left "alone", the Cardinal sets about wooing the Duchess. She protests, and he attempts to rape her. Hernando leaps out and strikes the Cardinal, and the Duchess runs off. Hernando stabs the Cardinal with the same sword he used to kill Columbo, and the rest of the court rushes in. Hernando stabs himself, and after denouncing the Cardinal as a rapist and celebrating himself for protecting the Duchess from harm, he dies. The Duchess finds her senses returned. The Cardinal confesses his many sins and asks for the King's pardon, and then reveals that he poisoned the Duchess at dinner and she is already dying. He offers an antidote and his apologies. She drinks the antidote, as does the Cardinal (to prove his good faith). The Cardinal then says the antidote is more poison. The Cardinal and the Duchess die.

The play ends with a comic epilogue stating that the play is a tragedy and if the audience liked it, they should show it, or else the epilogue will convince the playwright to give up writing, and they'll all be worse off if that happens.
