= The Triumph of Peace =

Masque (play) by James Shirley

- Written by: James Shirley
- Music by: William Lawes, Simon Ives, and Bulstrode Whitelocke
- Genre: Masque

Premiere
- Date: February 3, 1634

The Triumph of Peace was a Caroline era masque, "invented and written" by James Shirley, performed on 3 February 1634 and published the same year. The production was designed by Inigo Jones.

== Inspiration ==
The masque was lavishly sponsored by the four Inns of Court, through a political and social motive. In 1632 the Puritan controversialist William Prynne (himself an Inns of Court man) had dedicated his anti-theatre diatribe Histriomastix to the Inns; since Histriomastix was perceived as insulting to Queen Henrietta Maria, the masque was the Inns' signal of their total rejection of any connection with Prynne's book or his views.

Shirley was chosen to write the masque because he was a member of Gray's Inn. He was not a law student or a lawyer; rather, he was a gentleman boarder, an arrangement preferred by some literary figures of the time. (John Ford was another gentleman boarder). Shirley produced an acceptable text – though he was bold enough to offer some tactfully-phrased advice to his king.

== Publication ==
The masque was entered into the Stationers' Register on 24 January 1634 and was licensed for performance by Sir Henry Herbert, the Master of the Revels, on the date it was acted, 3 February 1634. (Some sources give the date for the masque as 1633, failing to compensate for the difference in Old Style and New Style dates.)

The work was published in the same year, in a quarto printed by John Norton for the bookseller William Cooke. The quarto exists in three impressions, with slight differences between the first and second and greater changes in the third. (W. W. Greg wrote an article titled "The Triumph of Peace: A Bibliographer's Nightmare".)

== Manuscript ==
A manuscript relating to the masque also exists, now in the collection of the Folger Shakespeare Library as item #25 in Folger MS. Z.e.1. The manuscript provides a cast list that names 184 of the participants in the procession (among a total of 882), along with details on the distribution of equipment and props.

== Music ==
The music for the masque was composed by William Lawes, Simon Ives, and Bulstrode Whitelocke. Musical aspects of the performance were managed for the Inns of Court by Whitelocke, the jurist and Parliamentarian, who was also an accomplished musician. Documents pertaining to the masque were preserved among Whitelocke's unpublished papers. As a result, more is known about the production of The Triumph of Peace than perhaps any other masque of the Tudor or Stuart eras – including "a cast list, the names and voice parts of all the singers, the names and instruments of all the musicians, diagrams with musicians' names for soloists and chorus positions during the mask, a cue sheet for the serious part of the mask, names of musicians who played at the Blackfriars and Cockpit," and other data.

(Murray Lefkowitz, the musicologist who discovered the masque papers at Longleat, has written extensively on the subject. Musicologist Andrew Sabol also published some of the relevant documents.)

== The performance ==
The performance was given at Whitehall Palace by members of the Inns of Court and was seen by the King, Charles I, and the Queen. The masquers started out at Ely House, then the London residence of the Bishops of Ely, and moved in procession or "cavalcade" down Chancery Lane and the Strand to Whitehall. This parade was led by the King's Marshall and his men bearing torches, who were followed by 100 members of the Inns of Court, 25 from each of the four Inns, dressed in gold and silver lace. Then came two music chariots; the first held eight lutenists dressed as priests and Sybils, while the second carried singers "who struck picturesque poses in costumes representing the celestial bodies in harmonious motion." Then came the actors of the masque; the boys in one anti-masque were costumed as birds. The principal masquers came last, in four chariots, each drawn by four horses; the horses were decked in silver and crimson cloths and white and red feathers, and each chariot bore two "flaming huge flambeaux" on its sides. (Each of the Inns of Court furnished twenty dozen torches and 15 flambeaux for the procession.) Charles and Henrietta Maria, watching this from Whitehall, were so impressed that they had the parade turn around and pass them again.

The theme of the masque was relatively simple and straightforward: the spirits of Peace, Law, and Justice descend to honor the English monarchs. Yet the expression is complex, with seven changes of scene; at one point the moon sets in an open landscape and "Amphiluche," the harbinger of morning, rises in turn. There are no fewer than eight anti-masques.

The masque featured the personifications standard to the form, including Opinion, Confidence, Fancy, Jollity, Novelty, and others; also, generic tradesmen, a Tailor, Carpenter, Painter, Feathermaker's Wife, Embroiderer's Wife, etc. The costumes were rich and fantastic: "Fancy in a suit of several-colored feathers, hooded, a pair of bat's wings on his shoulders...Jollity in a flame-colored suit, but tricked like a morris dancer, with scarfs and napkins, his hat fashioned like a cone...." Some of the costumes were "wrought as thick with silver spangles as they could be placed." At one point in the masque, a windmill, a knight and his squire entered – an obvious allusion to Don Quixote — and engaged in a mock combat. Shirley deliberately included elements in the masque, including "two wanton gamesters," that were precisely the type of elements criticized by Prynne in Histriomastix.

Queen Henrietta liked the masque so much that she arranged for a repeat performance at Merchant Taylors' Hall on 13 February. The cost for the show was extraordinary: £1000 for the music; a hundred costumes at £100 each. The total cost of the extravaganza was, according to Whitelocke, £21,000, all paid by the Inns of Court (at a time when a squire might earn £100 in a year). By some accounts (including that of Shirley himself), The Triumph of Peace was the most spectacular masque of the period.
