= 1646 in literature =

This article contains information about the literary events and publications of 1646.

== Events ==
- March 24 – The King's Men petition Parliament for three-and-a-half years' back pay, even though the London theatres officially remain closed through the middle 1640s. No details of their activities in these years survive.
- May 5 – Martin Llewellyn's drama The King Found at Southwell is performed at Oxford; it is the last stage piece presented in the city before its surrender to Parliamentary forces in the English Civil War on June 22–24.
- July – John Lilburne is placed in the Tower of London for denouncing his former commander the Earl of Manchester as a traitor.
- September 6 – The Biblioteca Palafoxiana is established in Puebla, Mexico, through the donation of books by Bishop Juan de Palafox y Mendoza, perhaps the earliest public library in the American colonies.
- unknown dates
  - Henry Burkhead's closet drama Cola's Fury, or Lirenda's Misery, based on the Irish Rebellion of 1641 ("Lirenda" is an anagram), is published in Kilkenny (dated 1645). Burkhead presents the historical persons involved under pseudonyms: among others, the Earl of Ormonde as "Osiris" and Sir John Borlase as "Berosus".
  - Jacqueline Pascal is converted to Jansenism, under the influence of her brother, Blaise Pascal.

== New books ==
=== Prose ===
- Anonymous (John Lilburne?) – London's Liberty in Chains Discovered
- Anonymous (John Lilburne?) – Vox Plebis, or the People's Outcry
- Anonymous [Gabriel de la Vega?) - Vida y hechos de Estebanillo González
- Sir Thomas Browne Pseudodoxia Epidemica or Vulgar Errors
- Diego de Saavedra Fajardo – Corona gótica, castellana y austríaca
- Thomas Fuller – Andronicus or the Unfortunate Politician
- Baltasar Gracián – El discreto
- Philippe Labbe - La Géographie royale
- Vavasor Powell - The Scriptures Concord
- Sir John Suckling – An Account of Religion by Reason published

=== Children ===
- John Cotton – Spiritual Milk for Boston Babes

=== Drama ===
- Pierre Corneille – Théodore
- Jean de Rotrou
  - Célie
  - Le Veritable Saint Genest
- James Shirley – The Triumph of Beauty (masque)
- Sir John Suckling – Fragmenta Aurea, collected plays, including The Sad One (unfinished)

=== Poetry ===
- Richard Crashaw – Steps to the Temple
- Martin Lluelyn – Men-Miracles
- John Milton – Poems of Mr. John Milton, Both English and Latin, compos'd at several times (dated 1645, published early 1646)
- Francis Quarles – The Shepherds' Oracle
- James Shirley – Poems
- Henry Vaughan – Poems, with the Tenth Satire of Juvenal Englished

== Births ==
- March 19 – Michael Kongehl, German poet (died 1710)
- July 1 – Gottfried Leibniz, German mathematician and philosopher (died 1716)
- July 20 – Eusèbe Renaudot, French theologian and orientalist (died 1720)
- Probable – John Mason, English poet, cleric and hymnist (died 1694)

== Deaths ==
- August 19 – Alexander Henderson, Scottish theologian (born c. 1583)
- September 17 – Erycius Puteanus, Netherlandish philologist and encyclopedist (born 1574)
- October 23 – David Wedderburn, Scottish educationist and schoolbook author (born 1580)
- December 23 – François Maynard, French poet (born c. 1582)
