= James Shirley =

English poet and playwright (1596–1666)

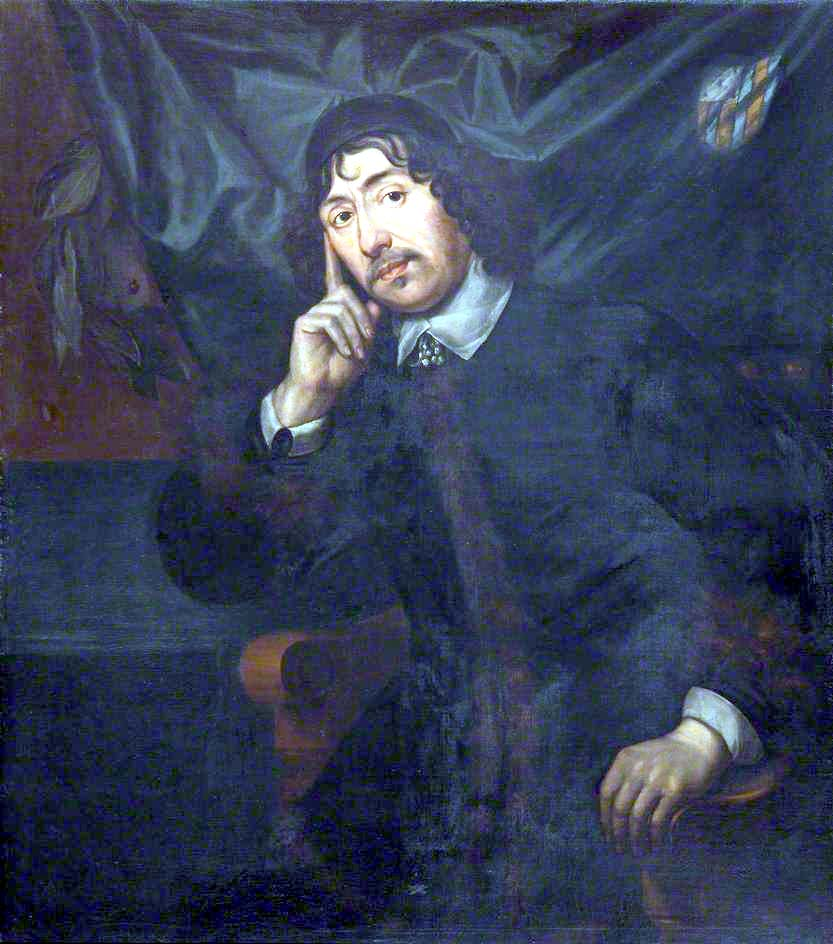
Portrait of Shirley

James Shirley (September 1596 – October 1666) was an English poet and playwright. In Charles Lamb's view, Shirley "claims a place among the worthies of this period, not so much for any transcendent genius in himself, as that he was the last of a great race, all of whom spoke nearly the same language and had a set of moral feelings and notions in common." He is known for deftly employing verse drama in the service of comedy (rather than tragedy). His career of play writing extended from 1625 to the suppression of stage plays by the Parliament of England in 1642.

== Biography ==
Arms of James Shirley: Paly of six, or and azure, a quarter ermine, a crescent for difference

=== Early life ===
Shirley was born in London and was descended from the Shirleys of Warwick, the oldest knighted family in Warwickshire. He was educated at Merchant Taylors' School, London, St John's College, Oxford, and St Catharine's College, Cambridge, where he took his BA degree in or before 1618.

His first poem, Echo, or the Unfortunate Lovers was published in 1618; no copy of it is known, but it is probably the same as 1646's Narcissus. Oxford biographer Anthony Wood reports that, after earning his MA, Shirley became "a minister of God's word in or near St Albans". He then left this post, apparently due to a conversion to the Roman Catholic faith, and was master of St Albans School from 1623 to 1625. His first play, Love Tricks, seems to have been written while he was teaching at St Albans.

=== Playwright in London ===
In 1625 he returned to London, living in Gray's Inn. In the following 18 years, he wrote more than 30 regular plays, tragedies, comedies, and tragicomedies. Most of his plays were performed by Queen Henrietta's Men, the playing company for which Shirley served as house dramatist (much as William Shakespeare had for the King's Men).

Shirley's sympathies were with the King in his disputes with Parliament, and he received marks of special favour from the Queen. He made a bitter attack on William Prynne, who had attacked the stage in Histriomastix, and, in 1634 he supplied the text for The Triumph of Peace, a masque presented at Whitehall by the gentlemen of the Inns of Court as a practical reply to Prynne.

=== Dublin and return to London ===
Between 1636 and 1640 Shirley went to Ireland, apparently under the patronage of the Earl of Kildare. Three or four of his plays were produced by his friend John Ogilby in Dublin's Werburgh Street Theatre, the first ever built in Ireland and at the time of Shirley's visit only one year old. During his Dublin stay, Shirley wrote The Doubtful Heir, The Royal Master, The Constant Maid, and St. Patrick for Ireland.

In 1640 he returned to London, and found that in his absence Queen Henrietta's Men had sold off a dozen of his plays to the stationers, who published them in the late 1630s. As a result, he would no longer work for Queen Henrietta's company, and the final plays of his London career were acted by the King's Men.

=== Theatre closure and civil war ===
In 1642, his career as a playwright was stopped by the London theatre closure.

On the outbreak of the English Civil War, Shirley seems to have served with the Earl of Newcastle, but when the King's fortunes began to decline he returned to London. He owed something to the kindness of Thomas Stanley, but supported himself chiefly by teaching and publishing some educational works under the Commonwealth. Besides these, he published during the Commonwealth period four small volumes of poems and plays, in 1646, 1653, 1655 and 1659. He "was a drudge" for John Ogilby in his translations of the Iliad and the Odyssey.

=== Late life and death ===
He survived into the reign of Charles II, but did not again attempt to write for the stage, though some of his comedies were revived.

Wood says that Shirley, aged 70, and his second wife died of fright and exposure after the Great Fire of London, and were buried at St Giles in the Fields on 29 October 1666.

== Assessment of writing ==
The 1911 Encyclopædia Britannica says of Shirley's works:

Shirley was born to great dramatic wealth, and he handled it freely. He constructed his own plots out of the abundance of materials that had been accumulated during thirty years of unexampled dramatic activity. He did not strain after novelty of situation or character, but worked with confident ease and buoyant copiousness on the familiar lines, contriving situations and exhibiting characters after types whose effectiveness on the stage had been proved by ample experience. He spoke the same language with the great dramatists, it is true, but this grand style is sometimes employed for the artificial elevation of commonplace thought. "Clear as day" becomes in this manner "day is not more conspicuous than this cunning"; while the proverb "Still waters run deep" is ennobled into—

"The shallow rivers glide away with noise—
The deep are silent".

The violence and exaggeration of many of his contemporaries left him untouched. His scenes are ingeniously conceived, his characters boldly and clearly drawn; and he never falls beneath a high level of stage effect.

== Works ==
The following list includes years of first publication, and of performance if known, and dates of licensing by the Master of the Revels where available.

=== Tragedies ===
- The Maid's Revenge (licensed 9 Feb 1626; first printed 1639)
- The Traitor (licensed 4 May 1631; first printed 1635)
- Love's Cruelty (licensed 14 Nov 1631; printed 1640)
- The Politician (acted 1639; printed 1655)
- The Cardinal (licensed 25 Nov 1641; printed 1652). Performed 2017 Southwark Playhouse

=== City Comedies set in 1630s London ===
- Love Tricks, or the School of Complement (licensed 10 Feb 1625; first printed under its subtitle, 1631)
- The Wedding (licensed 1626; first printed 1629)
- The Witty Fair One (licensed 3 Oct 1628; printed 1633)
- Changes: Or, Love in a Maze (licensed 10 Jan 1632; printed 1632)
- Hyde Park (licensed 20 April 1632; printed 1637)
- The Ball (licensed 16 Nov 1632; printed 1639)
- The Gamester (licensed 11 Nov 1633; printed 1637)
- The Lady of Pleasure (licensed 15 Oct 1635; printed 1637)

=== Tragicomedies, pastorals and others ===
- The Grateful Servant (licensed 3 Nov 1629 as The Faithful Servant; first printed 1630)
- The Humorous Courtier (licensed 17 May 1631; printed 1640).
- The Bird in a Cage, or The Beauties (licensed 21 Jan 1633; printed 1633)
- The Young Admiral (licensed 3 July 1633; printed 1637)
- The Example (licensed 24 June 1634; printed 1637)
- The Opportunity (licensed 29 Nov 1634; printed 1640)
- The Coronation (licensed 6 Feb 1635 as Shirley's, but printed in 1640 erroneously as a work of John Fletcher)
- The Duke's Mistress (licensed 18 Jan 1636; printed 1638)
- The Royal Master (licensed 23 April 1638; first printed 1638)
- St. Patrick for Ireland (performed ca. 1637–40; first printed 1640)
- The Gentleman of Venice (licensed 30 Oct 1639; printed 1655)
- The Doubtful Heir (licensed 1 June 1640 as Rosania, or Love's Victory; printed 1652)
- The Arcadia (printed 1640)
- The Imposture (licensed 10 Nov 1640; printed 1652)
- The Brothers (licensed 26 May 1641; printed 1652)
- The Constant Maid, or Love Will Find Out the Way (performed ca. 1630–40; first printed 1640)
- The Sisters (licensed 26 April 1642; printed 1653)
- The Court Secret (composed before 1642; printed 1653)

=== Masques and entertainments ===
- A Contention for Honor and Riches (performed ca. 1625–32; printed 1633)
- The Triumph of Peace (licensed 3 Feb 1634; printed 1634)
- The Triumph of Beauty (ca. 1640; printed 1646)
- The Contention of Ajax and Ulysses for the Armour of Achilles (performed ca. 1654–58; printed 1659)
- Cupid and Death (performed 26 March 1653; first printed 1653)
- Honoria and Mammon (printed 1659; performed 21 November 2013)

In 1633, Shirley revised a play by John Fletcher, possibly called The Little Thief, into The Night Walker, which was acted in 1634 and printed in 1640. In 1634–35, Shirley revised The Tragedy of Chabot, Admiral of France, a play that George Chapman had written sometime between 1611 and 1622. The revised version was printed in 1639. Shirley has sometimes been credited as a collaborator with William Cavendish, 1st Duke of Newcastle on Cavendish's plays The Country Captain and The Variety (both printed 1649). The Ball, in the publication attributed to George Chapman and James Shirley, was written by Shirley alone.

Shirley's Poems (1646) contained the epyllion Narcissus and the masque The Triumph of Beauty. A Contention for Honour and Riches (1633) appeared in an altered and enlarged form in 1659 as Honoria and Mammon. His Contention of Ajax and Ulysses closes with the well-known lyric "The Glories of our Blood and State." In the final pedagogic stage of his career, Shirley published an English grammar written in poetry, titled Rudiments of Grammar: The Rules Composed in English Verse for the Greater Benefit and Delight of Young Beginners (1656).

Eight of Shirley's plays were reprinted in a single quarto volume in 1640; these were The Young Admiral, The Duke's Mistress, Hyde Park, Love's Cruelty, The Wedding, The Constant Maid, The Opportunity, and The Grateful Servant. In 1653 another collection was published by Humphrey Moseley and Humphrey Robinson; titled Six New Plays, the volume included The Brothers, The Sisters, The Doubtful Heir, The Imposture, The Cardinal, and The Court Secret.

Shirley's canon presents fewer problems and lost works than the canons of earlier dramatists; yet William Cooke registered a Shirley tragedy titled Saint Albans on 14 February 1639 – a play that has not survived. The anonymous tragedy Andromana was assigned to Shirley when it was first published in 1660, though scholars have treated the attribution with scepticism.

The standard edition of Shirley's works is The Dramatic Works and Poems of James Shirley, with Notes by William Gifford, and Additional Notes, and some Account of Shirley and his Writings, by Alexander Dyce (6 vols., 1833). A selection of his plays was edited (1888) for the Mermaid Series, with an introduction by Edmund Gosse.

A new ten-volume edition of James Shirley's work is currently being edited for Oxford University Press. Volume 7 in this series is forthcoming in 2022.

=== Revivals ===
Shirley's work has occasionally seen revivals. Honoria and Mammon was staged in London at Shirley's church, on 21 November 2013. The Cardinal has seen an adaptation, Red Snake, and a production in London in April 2017. 'The Glories of Our Blood and State' (also known under the later title 'Death The Leveller') from The Contention of Ajax and Ulysses was often set to music, and played at the coronation of George IV in 1821.
