= Werburgh Street Theatre =

Former theatre in Dublin, Ireland

Coordinates: 53.3421°N 6.2701°W

- Interactive map of Werburgh Street Theatre
- Address: 13 Werburgh Street; Dublin; Ireland
- Owner: John Ogilby
- Type: theatre

Construction
- Opened: 1637
- Closed: 1641

The Werburgh Street Theatre, also the Saint Werbrugh Street Theatre or the New Theatre, was a seventeenth-century theatre in Dublin, Ireland. Scholars and historians of the subject generally identify it as the "first custom-built theatre in the city," "the only pre-Restoration playhouse outside London," and the first Dublin theatre.

== Establishment ==
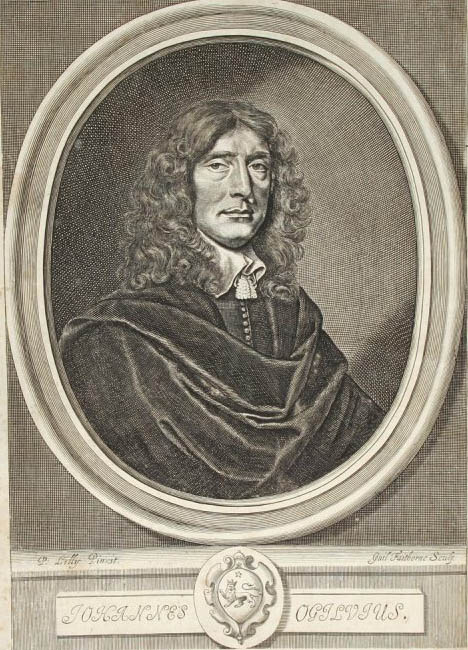
Portrait of John Ogilby, founder of the Werburgh Street Theatre

The Werburgh Street Theatre was established by John Ogilby at least by 1637 and perhaps as early as 1634. It was a roofed and enclosed building, or what was then called a "private theatre" like the contemporaneous Cockpit Theatre or Salisbury Court Theatre in London (as opposed to a large open-air "public theatre" like the Globe or the Red Bull). According to one report, the theatre "had a gallery and pit, but no boxes, except one on the stage for the then Lord Deputy of Ireland, the Earl of Strafford." Ogilby had come to Ireland in Strafford's entourage, and Strafford, who was fond of the theatre, gave him every encouragement. John Aubrey termed it "a pretty little theatre." No trace of it survives, but it was located on Werburgh Street near Dublin Castle.

== Associations ==
The playhouse was closely associated, during its short lifetime, with James Shirley, the prominent London dramatist who spent the years 1637–40 in Dublin. (Shirley left London when the theatres closed due to a severe outbreak of bubonic plague, from May 1636 to October 1637.) Shirley wrote four plays for the theatre, The Royal Master, The Doubtful Heir, The Constant Maid, and St. Patrick for Ireland; the first of these plays premiered on 1 January 1638, the last was performed in the autumn of 1639.

During the same period, the theatre also performed Jonson's The Alchemist, Middleton's No Wit, No Help Like a Woman's, two plays from the John Fletcher canon, and anonymous plays titled The General and The Toy. The earliest published play by an Irish author, Henry Burnell's Landgartha, was acted at the theatre on 17 March 1640. Shirley wrote Prologues for all of these works.

Shirley may also have brought some London actors with him to Dublin. Shirley had functioned as the house dramatist for Queen Henrietta's Men, but the plague crisis of 1636–37 had disrupted that company. Four veterans of the troupe — William Allen, Michael Bowyer, Hugh Clark, and William Robbins — disappeared from the London theatre scene for the time that Shirley was in Dublin; they reappeared at the end of the Dublin venture in 1640, when all four joined the King's Men. The years of the Werburgh fill the holes in the four actors' careers.

== Closure ==
"The Theatre came to a sudden end with the outbreak of the rebellion in 1641. In October the Lords Justices prohibited playing there; and shortly after, we are told, the building was 'ruined and spoiled, and a cow-house made of the stage.'" (Shirley had sailed for England on 18 April 1640.)

Three and a half centuries later, the site of the former theatre was the yard of Kerfoot's Dining Rooms at 13 Werburgh Street, Dublin..
