= First Folio =

1623 collection of William Shakespeare's plays

Mr. William Shakespeare's Comedies, Histories, & Tragedies
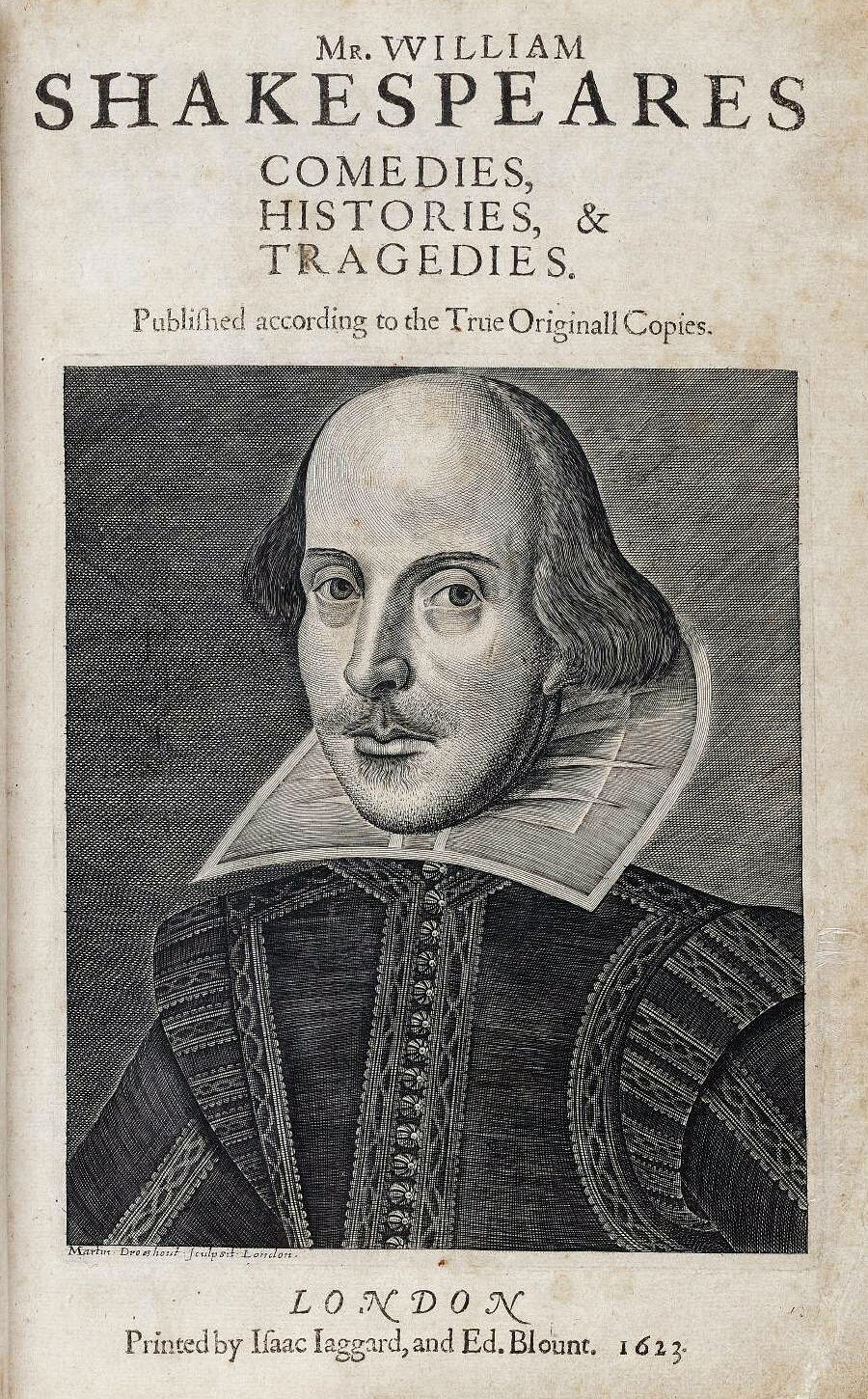
- Title page of the first impression (1623)
- Author: William Shakespeare
- Cover artist: Martin Droeshout
- Language: Early Modern English
- Genre: English Renaissance theatre
- Publisher: Edward Blount and William and Isaac Jaggard
- Publication date: 1623
- Publication place: England
- Pages: c. 900
- Text: Mr. William Shakespeare's Comedies, Histories, & Tragedies at Wikisource

Mr. William Shakespeare's Comedies, Histories, & Tragedies is a collection of plays by William Shakespeare, commonly referred to by modern scholars as the First Folio, (Note: More generally, the term first folio is employed in other appropriate contexts, as in connection with the first folio collection of Ben Jonson's works (1616), or the first folio collection of the plays in the Beaumont and Fletcher canon (1647).) published in 1623, about seven years after Shakespeare's death. It is considered one of the most influential books ever published.

Printed in folio format and containing 36 of Shakespeare's plays, it was prepared by Shakespeare's colleagues John Heminges and Henry Condell. It was dedicated to the "incomparable pair of brethren" William Herbert, 3rd Earl of Pembroke, and his brother Philip Herbert, Earl of Montgomery (later 4th Earl of Pembroke).

Although 19 of Shakespeare's plays had been published in quarto before 1623, the First Folio is arguably the only reliable text for about 20 of the plays, and a valuable source text for many of those previously published. Eighteen of the plays in the First Folio, including The Tempest, Twelfth Night, Macbeth, Julius Caesar and Measure for Measure among others, are not known to have been previously printed. The Folio includes all of the plays generally accepted to be Shakespeare's, except the following plays which are believed likely to have been written, at least partly, by Shakespeare: Pericles, Prince of Tyre; The Two Noble Kinsmen; Edward III; and the two lost plays, Cardenio and Love's Labour's Won. Some believe the last of these is an alternative title for a known published Shakespeare play.

Of perhaps 750 copies printed, 235 are known to remain, most of which are kept in either public archives or private collections. More than one third of the extant copies are housed at the Folger Shakespeare Library in Washington, D.C., which is home to a total of 82 First Folios.

== Background ==
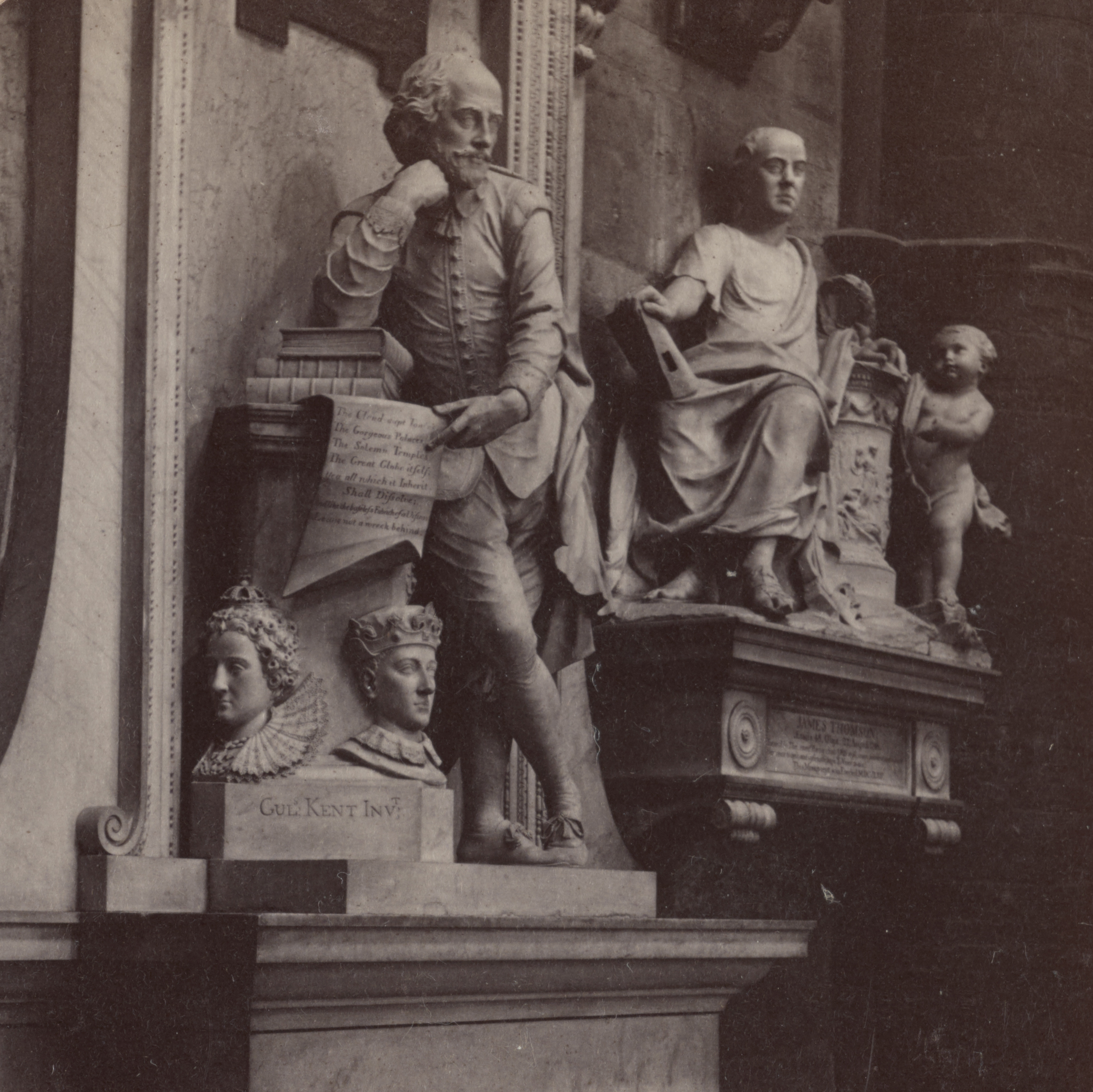
Memorial to William Shakespeare in the Poets' Corner, Westminster Abbey

After a long career as an actor, dramatist, and sharer in the Lord Chamberlain's Men (later the King's Men) from c. 1585–90 (Note: The exact years of his London career are unknown, but biographers suggest that it may have begun any time from the mid-1580s to just before Robert Greene mentions Shakespeare in his Groats-Worth of Wit.) until c. 1610–13, William Shakespeare died in Stratford-upon-Avon, on 23 April 1616, (Note: Dates follow the Julian calendar, used in England throughout Shakespeare's lifespan, but with the start of the year adjusted to 1 January (see Old Style and New Style dates). Under the Gregorian calendar, adopted in Catholic countries in 1582, Shakespeare died on 3 May.) and was buried in the chancel of the Church of the Holy Trinity two days later.

Shakespeare's works—both poetic and dramatic—had a rich history in print before the publication of the First Folio: from the first publications of Venus and Adonis (1593) and The Rape of Lucrece (1594), 78 individual printed editions of his works are known. Of these, 23 consist of his poetry and the remaining 55 his plays. Counting by number of editions published before 1623, the best-selling works were Venus and Adonis (12 editions), The Rape of Lucrece (six editions), and Henry IV, Part 1 (six editions). Of the 23 editions of the poems, 16 were published in octavo; the rest, and almost all of the editions of the plays, were printed in quarto. The quarto format was made by folding a large sheet of printing paper twice, forming four leaves with eight pages. The average quarto measured 7 by 9 inches (18 by 23 cm) and was typically made up of nine sheets, giving 72 total pages. Octavos—made by folding a sheet of the same size three times, forming eight leaves with 16 pages—were about half as large as a quarto. Since the cost of paper represented about 50-75% of a book's total production costs, octavos were generally cheaper to manufacture than quartos, and a common way to reduce publishing costs was to reduce the number of pages needed by compressing (using two columns or a smaller typeface) or abbreviating the text.

[Publish me in] the Smallest size,
Least I bee eaten vnder Pippin-pyes.
Or in th’ Apothicaryes shop bee seene
To wrap Drugg's: or to dry Tobacco in.
First (might I chuse) I would be bound to wipe,
Where he discharged last his Glister-pipe.

— Henry Fitzgeffrey, Certain Elegies (1618)

Editions of individual plays were typically published in quarto and could be bought for 6d (equivalent to £5 in 2025) without a binding. These editions were primarily intended to be cheap and convenient, and read until worn out or repurposed as wrapping paper (or worse), rather than high quality objects kept in a library. Customers who wanted to keep a particular play would have to have it bound, and would typically bind several related or miscellany plays into one volume. Octavos, though nominally cheaper to produce, were somewhat different. From c. 1595–96 (Venus and Adonis) and 1598 (The Rape of Lucrece), Shakespeare's narrative poems were published in octavo. In The Cambridge Companion to Shakespeare's First Folio, Tara L. Lyons argues that this was partly due to the publisher, John Harrison's, desire to capitalize on the poems' association with Ovid: the Greek classics were sold in octavo, so printing Shakespeare's poetry in the same format would strengthen the association. The octavo generally carried greater prestige, so the format itself would help to elevate their standing. Ultimately, however, the choice was a financial one: Venus and Adonis in octavo needed four sheets of paper, versus seven in quarto, and the octavo The Rape of Lucrece needed five sheets, versus 12 in quarto. Whatever the motivation, the move seems to have had the intended effect: Francis Meres, the first known literary critic to comment on Shakespeare, in his Palladis Tamia (1598), puts it thus: "the sweete wittie soule of Ouid liues in mellifluous & hony-tongued Shakespeare, witnes his Venus and Adonis, his Lucrece, his sugred Sonnets among his priuate friends".

Pray tell me Ben, where does the mystery lurk,
What others call a play you call a work.

— anonymous, Wits Recreations (1640)

Publishing literary works in folio was not unprecedented. Starting with the publication of Sir Philip Sidney's The Countess of Pembroke's Arcadia (1593) and Astrophel and Stella (1598), both published by William Ponsonby, there were a significant number of folios published, and a significant number of them were published by the men who would later be involved in publishing the First Folio. (Note: Edward Fairfax's translation of Torquato Tasso's Godfrey of Bulloigne (1600), Thomas Heywood's Troia Britanica (1609), and Boccaccio's Decameron (1620) was published in folio by William and Isaac Jaggard; Montaigne's Essays (1603, 1613), Samuel Daniel's Panegyricke Congratulatory (1603), Lucan's Pharsalia (1614), and James Mabbe's translation of Mateo Alemán's The Rogue (1623) were published by Edward Blount; and John Smethwick published Ben Jonson's Works (1616), and Michael Drayton's Poems (1619). All told, a quarter of the literary folios produced in London between 1600 and 1623 were the work of these three publishers.) But quarto was the typical format for plays printed in the period: folio was a prestige format, typically used, according to Fredson Bowers, for books of "superior merit or some permanent value".

== Printing ==
The contents of the First Folio were compiled by John Heminges and Henry Condell; the members of the Stationers Company who published the book were the booksellers Edward Blount and the father/son team of William and Isaac Jaggard. William Jaggard has seemed an odd choice by the King's Men because he had published the questionable collection The Passionate Pilgrim as Shakespeare's, and in 1619 had printed new editions of 10 Shakespearean quartos to which he did not have clear rights, some with false dates and title pages (the False Folio affair). Indeed, his contemporary Thomas Heywood, whose poetry Jaggard had pirated and misattributed to Shakespeare, specifically reports that Shakespeare was "much offended with M. Jaggard (that altogether unknown to him) presumed to make so bold with his name."

Heminges and Condell emphasised that the Folio was replacing the earlier publications, which they characterised as "stol'n and surreptitious copies, maimed and deformed by frauds and stealths of injurious impostors", asserting that Shakespeare's true words "are now offer'd to your view cured, and perfect of their limbes; and all the rest, absolute in their numbers as he conceived them."

The paper industry in England was then in its infancy and the quantity of quality rag paper for the book was imported from France. It is thought that the typesetting and printing of the First Folio was such a large job that the King's Men simply needed the capacities of the Jaggards' shop. William Jaggard was old, infirm and blind by 1623, and died a month before the book went on sale; most of the work in the project must have been done by his son Isaac.

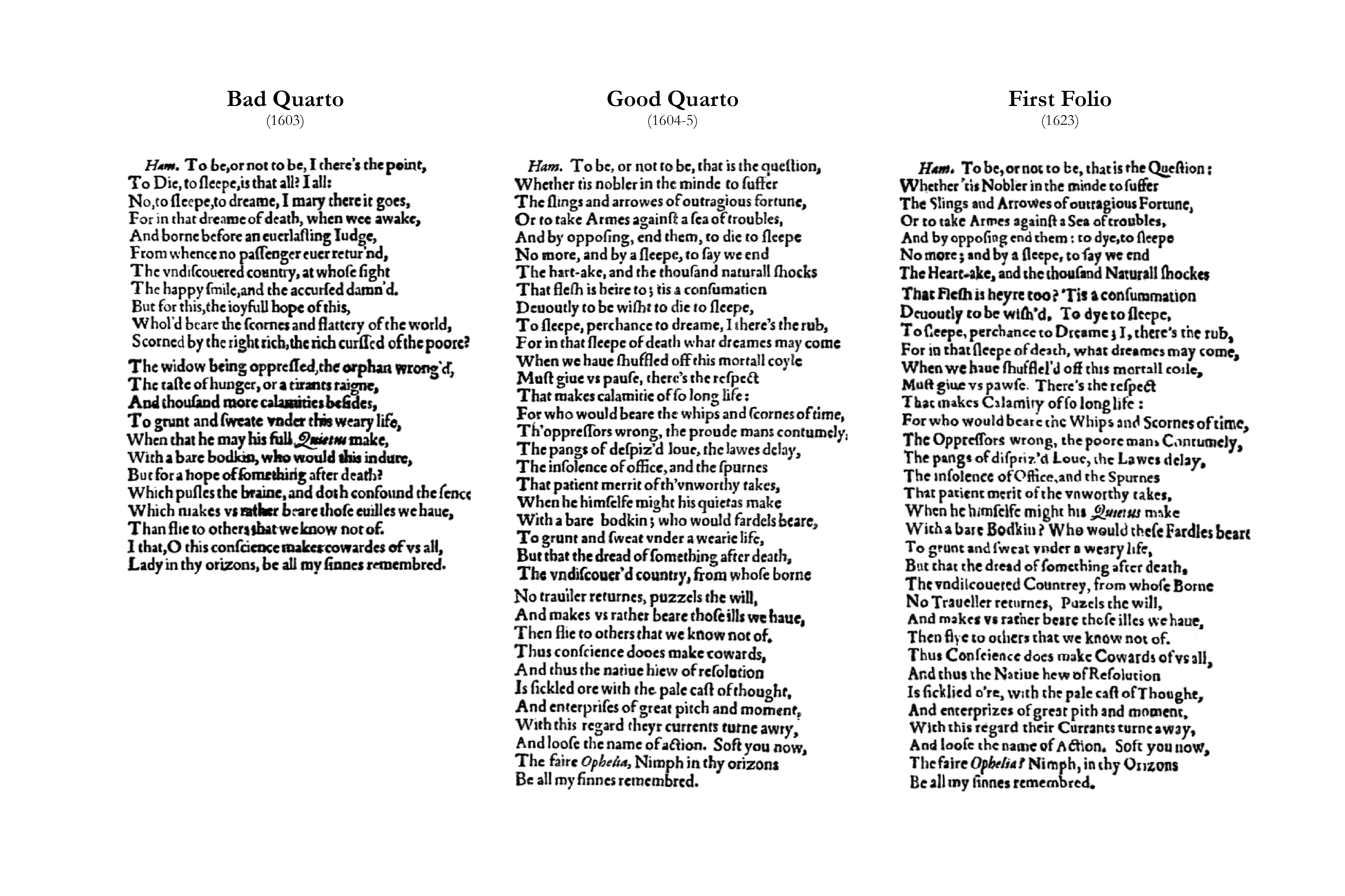
Comparison of the "To be, or not to be" soliloquy in the first three editions of Hamlet, showing the varying quality of the text in the Bad Quarto, the Good Quarto and the First Folio

The First Folio's publishing syndicate also included two stationers who owned the rights to some of the individual plays that had been previously printed: William Aspley (Much Ado About Nothing and Henry IV, Part 2) and John Smethwick (Love's Labour's Lost, Romeo and Juliet, and Hamlet). Smethwick had been a business partner of another Jaggard, William's brother John.

The printing of the Folio was probably done between February 1622 and early November 1623, and the book was entered into the Stationers' Register on 8 November 1623 (Julian calendar). It is possible that the printer originally expected to have the book ready early, since it was listed in the Frankfurt Book Fair catalogue as a book to appear between April and October 1622, but the catalogue contained many books not yet printed by 1622, and the modern consensus is that the entry was simply intended as advance publicity. The first impression had a publication date of 1623, and the earliest record of a retail purchase is an account book entry for 5 December 1623 of Edward Dering (who purchased two); the Bodleian Library, in Oxford, received its copy in early 1624 (which it subsequently sold for £24 as a superseded edition when the Third Folio became available in 1663-1664).

== Contents ==
The 36 plays of the First Folio occur in the order given below.

Plays that had never been published before 1623 are marked accordingly, as are those set into type from manuscripts prepared by Ralph Crane, a professional scrivener employed by the King's Men, who produced high-quality results, with formal act/scene divisions, frequent use of parentheses and hyphenated forms, and other identifiable features. Each play is followed by the type of source used, as determined by bibliographical research.

The term foul papers refers to Shakespeare's working drafts of a play. When completed, a transcript or fair copy of the foul papers would be prepared, by the author or by a scribe. Such a manuscript would have to be heavily annotated with accurate and detailed stage directions and all the other data needed for performance, and then could serve as a prompt book, to be used by the prompter to guide a performance of the play. Any of these manuscripts, in any combination, could be used as a source for a printed text. The label Qn denotes the n th quarto edition of a play.

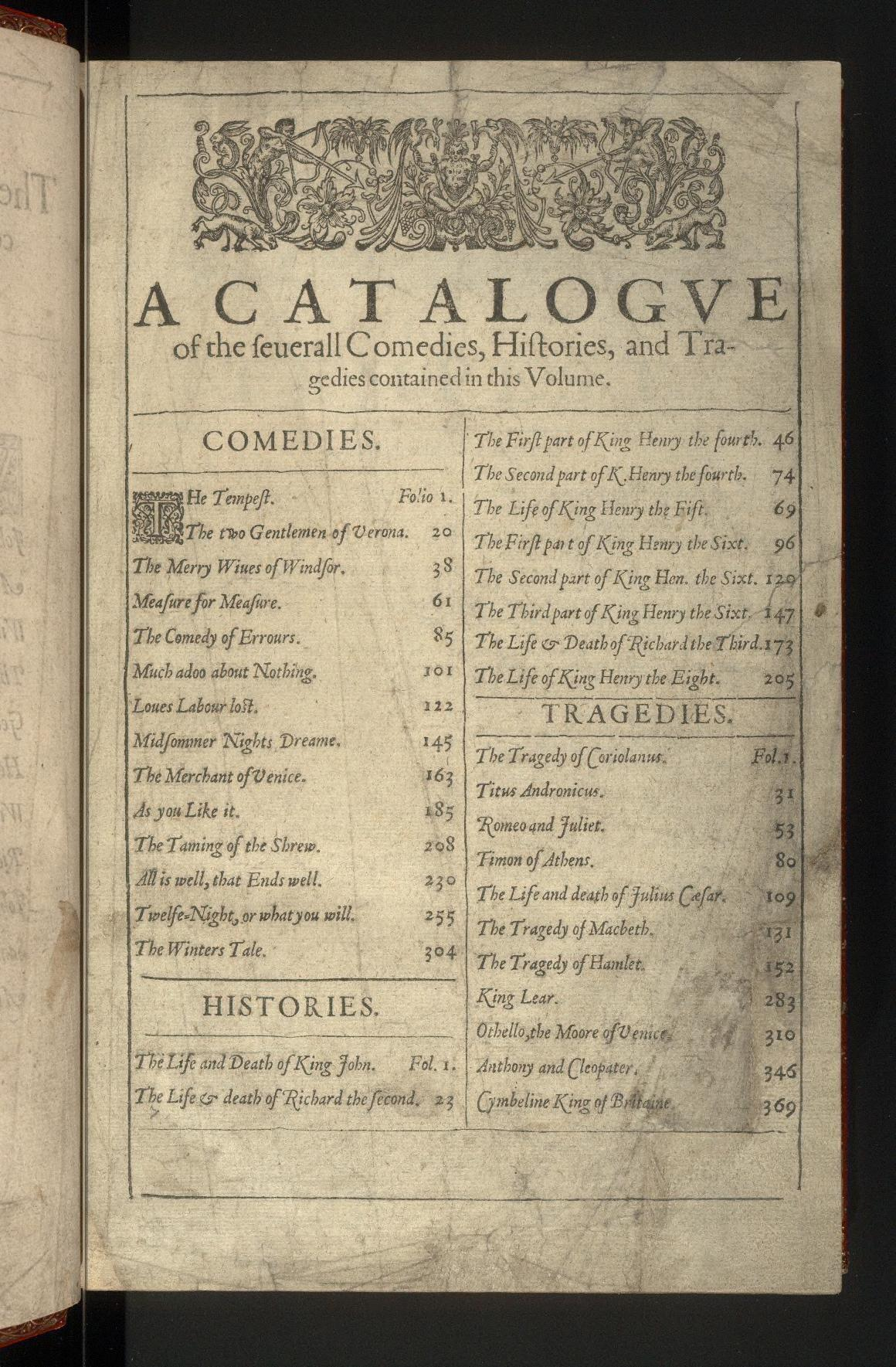
Table of Contents from the First Folio

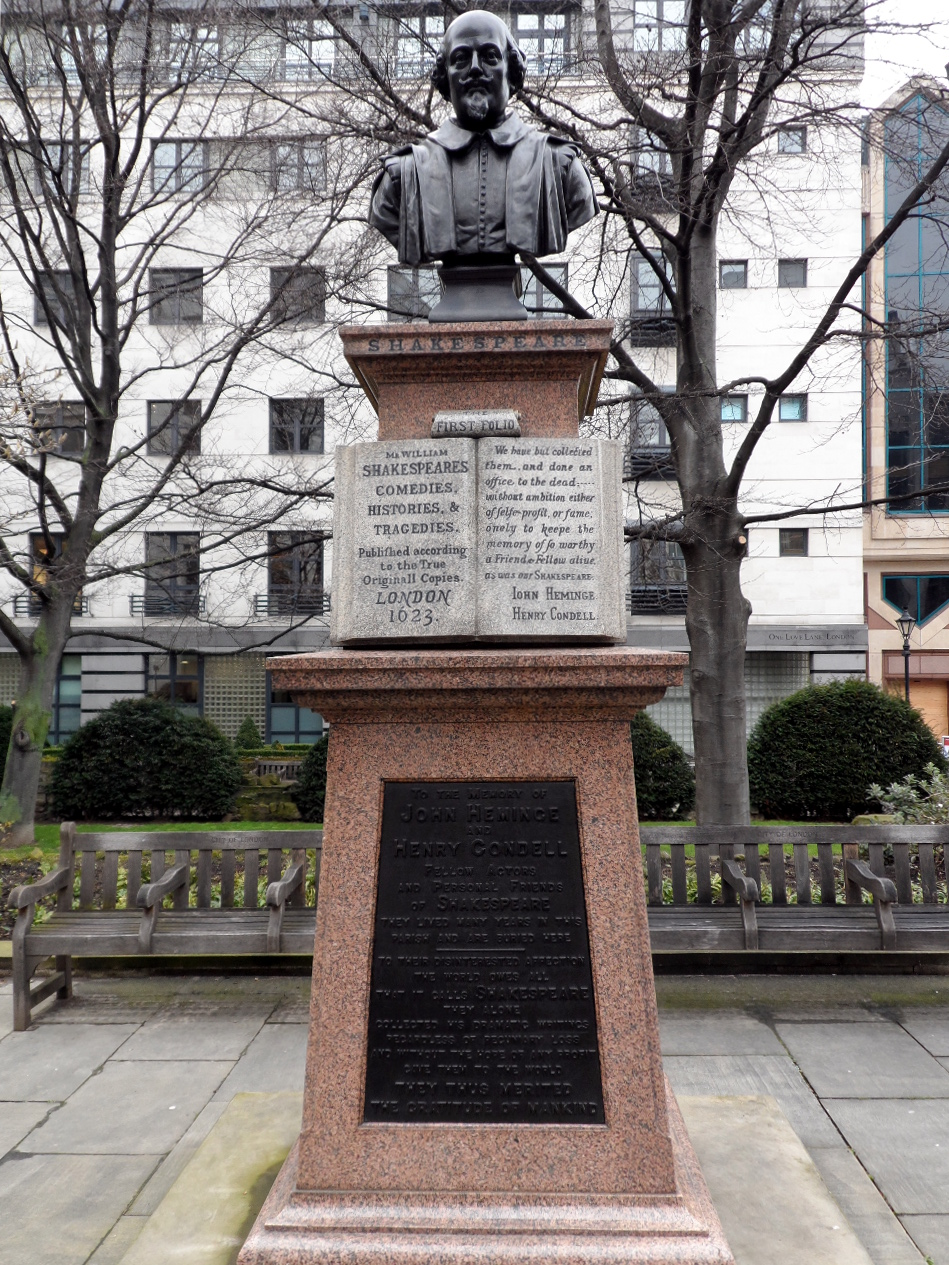
Memorial to John Heminges and Henry Condell, editors of the First Folio, at Bassishaw, London

Comedies

1. The Tempest ^{FF} ^{RC}
2. The Two Gentlemen of Verona ^{FF} ^{RC}
3. The Merry Wives of Windsor ^{RC}
4. Measure for Measure ^{FF} ^{RC?}
5. The Comedy of Errors ^{FF} – probably typeset from Shakespeare's "foul papers," lightly annotated
6. Much Ado About Nothing – typeset from a copy of the quarto, lightly annotated
7. Love's Labour's Lost – typeset from a corrected copy of Q1
8. A Midsummer Night's Dream – typeset from a copy of Q2, well-annotated, possibly used as a prompt-book
9. The Merchant of Venice – typeset from a lightly edited and corrected copy of Q1
10. As You Like It ^{FF} – from a quality manuscript, lightly annotated by a prompter
11. The Taming of the Shrew ^{FF} – typeset from Shakespeare's "foul papers," somewhat annotated, perhaps as preparation for use as a prompt-book
12. All's Well That Ends Well ^{FF} – probably from Shakespeare's "foul papers" or a manuscript of them
13. Twelfth Night ^{FF} – typeset either from a prompt-book or a transcript of one
14. The Winter's Tale ^{FF} ^{RC}

Histories

15. King John ^{FF} – uncertain: a prompt-book, or "foul papers."
16. Richard II – typeset from Q3 and Q5, corrected against a prompt-book
17. Henry IV, Part 1 – typeset from an edited copy of Q5
18. Henry IV, Part 2 – uncertain: some combination of manuscript and quarto text
19. Henry V – typeset from Shakespeare's "foul papers."
20. Henry VI, Part 1 ^{FF} – likely from an annotated transcript of the author's manuscript
21. Henry VI, Part 2 – probably a Shakespearean manuscript used as a prompt-book
22. Henry VI, Part 3 – like 2H6, probably a Shakespearean prompt-book
23. Richard III – a difficult case: probably typeset partially from Q3, and partially from Q6 corrected against a manuscript (maybe "foul papers")
24. Henry VIII ^{FF} – typeset from a fair copy of the authors' manuscript

Tragedies

25. Troilus and Cressida – probably typeset from the quarto, corrected with Shakespeare's "foul papers," printed after the rest of the Folio was completed
26. Coriolanus ^{FF} – set from a high-quality authorial transcript
27. Titus Andronicus – typeset from a copy of Q3 that might have served as a prompt-book
28. Romeo and Juliet – in essence a reprint of Q3
29. Timon of Athens ^{FF} – set from Shakespeare's foul papers or a transcript of them
30. Julius Caesar ^{FF} – set from a prompt-book, or a transcript of a prompt-book
31. Macbeth ^{FF} – probably set from a prompt-book, perhaps detailing an adaptation of the play for a short indoor performance
32. Hamlet – one of the most difficult problems in the First Folio: probably typeset from some combination of Q2 and manuscript sources
33. King Lear – a difficult problem: probably set mainly from Q1 but with reference to Q2, and corrected against a prompt-book
34. Othello – another difficult problem: probably typeset from Q1, corrected with a quality manuscript
35. Antony and Cleopatra ^{FF} – possibly "foul papers" or a transcript of them
36. Cymbeline ^{FF} ^{RC? (Note: Either his, or from the official prompt-book.)}

Troilus and Cressida was originally intended to follow Romeo and Juliet, but the typesetting was stopped, probably due to a conflict over the rights to the play; it was later inserted as the first of the tragedies, when the rights question was resolved. It does not appear in the table of contents.

== Introductory poem ==
Ben Jonson wrote a preface to the folio with this poem addressed "To the Reader" facing the Droeshout portrait engraving:

This Figure, that thou here ſeeſt put,
It vvas for gentle Shakeſpeare cut;
Wherein the Grauer had a ſtrife
vvith Nature, to out-doo the life :
O, could he but haue dravvne his vvit
As vvell in braſſe, as he hath hit
His face; the Print vvould then ſurpaſſe
All, that vvas euer vvrit in braſſe.
But, ſince he cannot, Reader, looke
Not on his Picture, but his Booke.

B. I.

== Compositors ==
As far as modern scholarship has been able to determine, the First Folio texts were set into type by five compositors, with different spelling habits, peculiarities, and levels of competence. Researchers have labelled them A through E, A being the most accurate, and E an apprentice who had significant difficulties in dealing with manuscript copy. Their shares in typesetting the pages of the Folio break down like this:

	Comedies	Histories	Tragedies	Total pages
"A"	74	80	40	194
"B"	143	89	213	445
"C"	79	22	19	120
"D"	35 1/2	0	0	35 1/2
"E"	0	0	71 1/2	71 1/2

Compositor "E" was most likely one John Leason, whose apprenticeship contract dated only from 4 November 1622. One of the other four might have been a John Shakespeare, of Warwickshire, who apprenticed with Jaggard in 1610 to 1617. ("Shakespeare" was a common name in Warwickshire in that era; John was of no known relation to the playwright.)

== The First Folio and variants ==
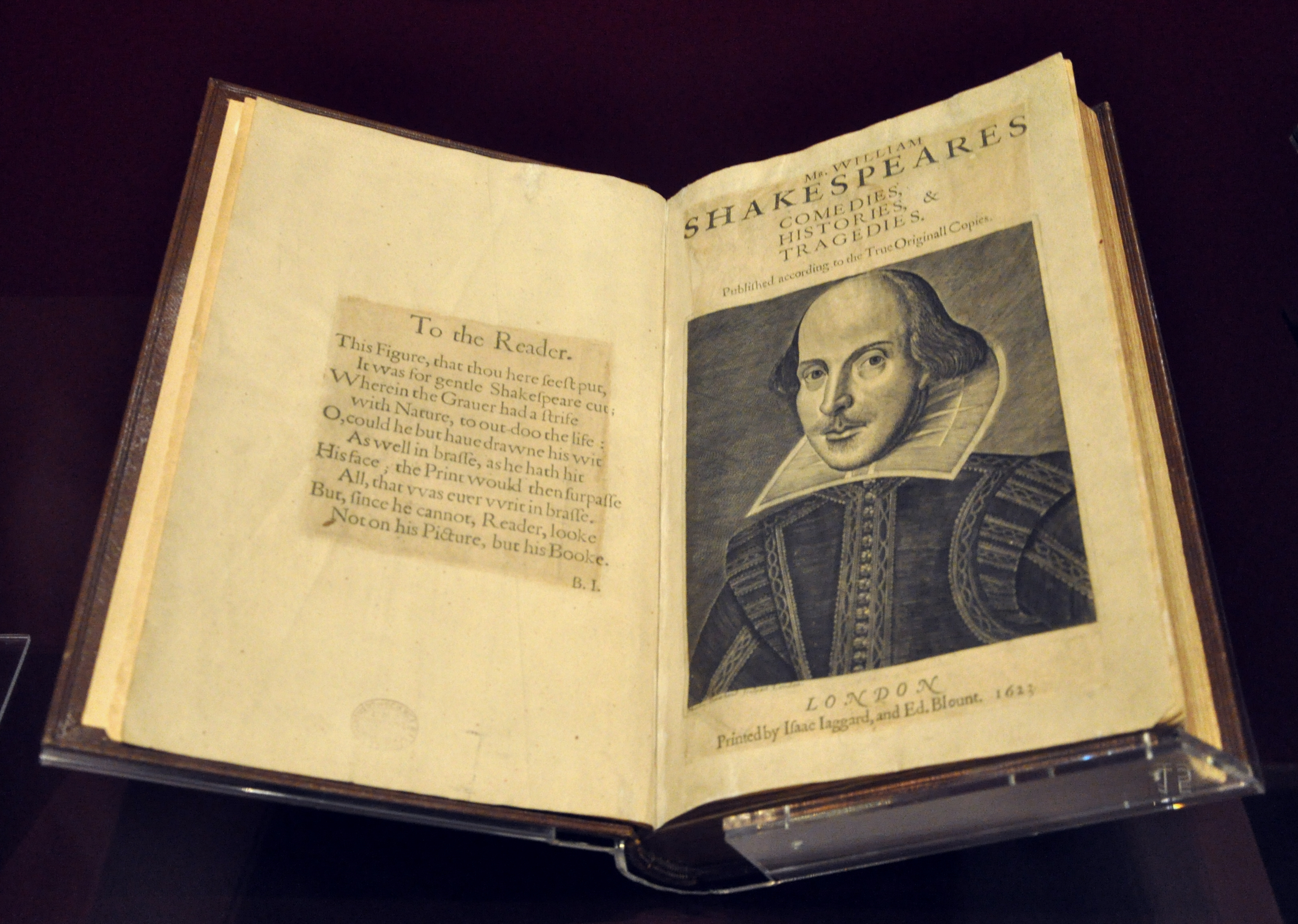
The First Folio (Victoria and Albert Museum, London)

W. W. Greg has argued that Edward Knight, the "book-keeper" or "book-holder" (prompter) of the King's Men, did the actual proofreading of the manuscript sources for the First Folio. Knight is known to have been responsible for maintaining and annotating the company's scripts, and making sure that the company complied with cuts and changes ordered by the Master of the Revels.

Some pages of the First Folio—134 out of the total of 900—were proofread and corrected while the job of printing the book was ongoing. As a result, the Folio differs from modern books in that individual copies vary considerably in their typographical errors. There were about 500 corrections made to the Folio in this way. These corrections by the typesetters, however, consisted only of simple typos, clear mistakes in their own work; the evidence suggests that they almost never referred back to their manuscript sources, let alone tried to resolve any problems in those sources. The well-known cruxes in the First Folio texts were beyond the typesetters' capacity to correct.

The Folio was typeset and bound in "sixes"—three sheets of paper, taken together, were folded into a booklet-like quire or gathering of six leaves, 12 pages. Once printed, the "sixes" were assembled and bound together to make the book. The sheets were printed in two-page formes, meaning that pages 1 and 12 of the first quire were printed simultaneously on one side of one sheet of paper (which became the "outer" side); then pages 2 and 11 were printed on the other side of the same sheet (the "inner" side). The same was done with pages 3 and 10, and 4 and 9, on the second sheet, and pages 5 and 8, and 6 and 7, on the third. Then the first quire could be assembled with its pages in the correct order. The next quire was printed by the same method: pages 13 and 24 on one side of one sheet, etc. This meant that the text being printed had to be "cast off"—the compositors had to plan beforehand how much text would fit onto each page. If the compositors were setting type from manuscripts (perhaps messy, revised and corrected manuscripts), their calculations would frequently be off by greater or lesser amounts, resulting in the need to expand or compress. A line of verse could be printed as two; or verse could be printed as prose to save space, or lines and passages could even be omitted (a disturbing prospect for those who prize Shakespeare's works).

The First Folio was reprinted three times in the 17th century, each time by different groups of stationers; these editions are referred to as the Second Folio, Third Folio, and Fourth Folio.

== Holdings, sales and valuations ==
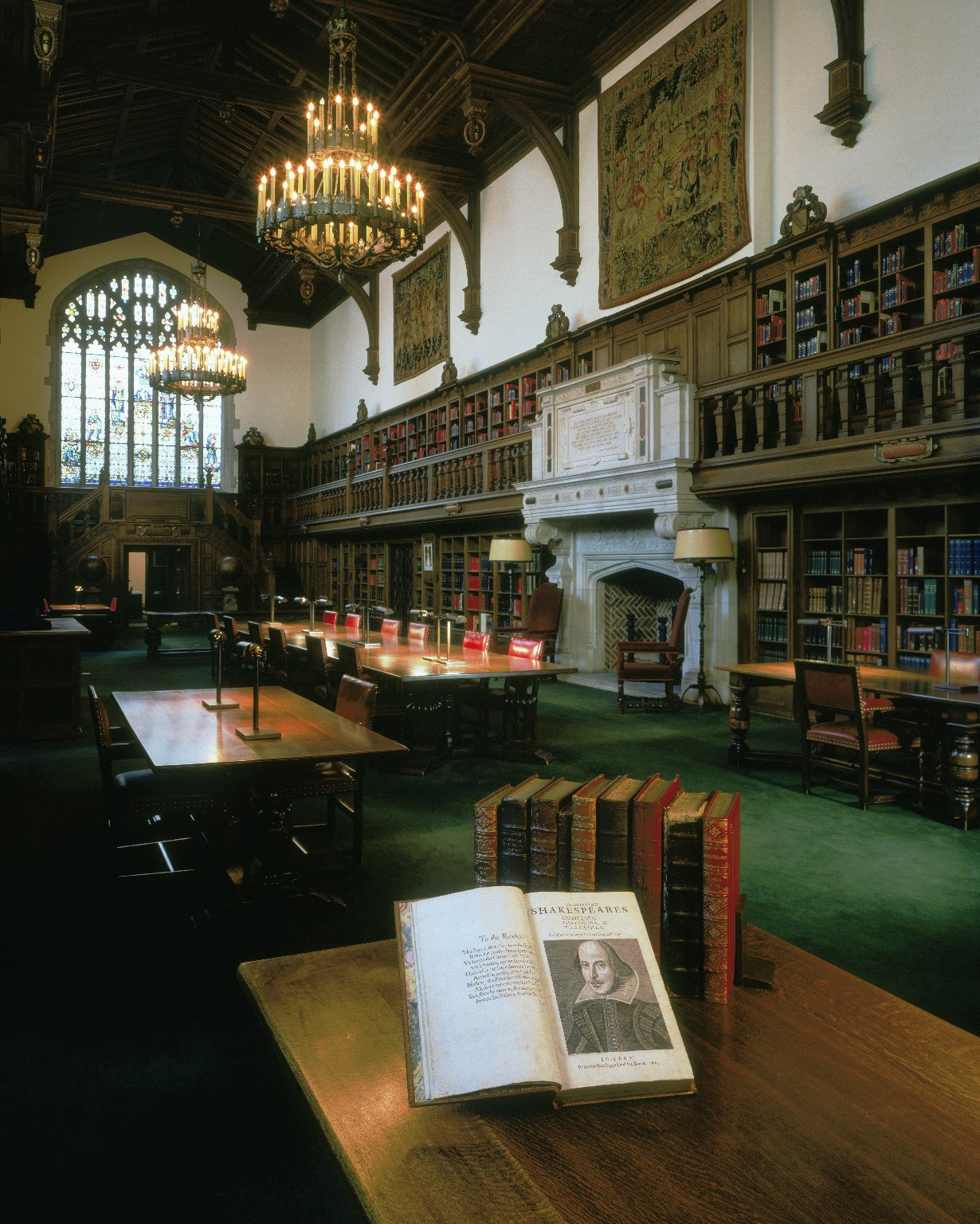
The Folger Shakespeare Library owns 82 copies of the First Folio—more than one third of all known surviving copies.

Jean-Christophe Mayer, in The Cambridge Companion to Shakespeare's First Folio (2016), estimates the original retail price of the First Folio to be about 15s (equivalent to £159 in 2025) for an unbound copy, and up to £1 (equivalent to £212 in 2025) for one bound in calfskin. (Note: He also cites previous estimates from Anthony James West, based in part on unpublished estimates by Peter Blayney, that the publisher's cost was about 6s 8d (equivalent to £70 in 2025), and the wholesale price no more than 10s (equivalent to £106 in 2025).) In terms of purchasing power, "a bound folio would be about forty times the price of a single play and represented almost two months' wages for an ordinary skilled worker."

It is believed that around 750 copies of the First Folio were printed, of which there are 235 known surviving copies.

=== Holdings ===
The world's largest collection is in the possession of the Folger Shakespeare Library (82 copies) in Washington, D.C., followed by Meisei University (12) in Tokyo, the New York Public Library (six) in New York City, and the British Library (five) in London. The Folger collection alone accounts for more than one third of all known surviving copies. Together, the nine largest First Folio collections comprise more than half of all known extant copies.

Thirty-one American colleges and universities own a total of 38 copies of the First Folio, while seven British universities own 14 copies. Universities in possession of copies include the University of Cambridge (four), the University of Oxford (four), the University of Texas at Austin (three), Princeton University (three), Brown University (two), Harvard University (two), the University of London (two), Carnegie Mellon University (two), Dartmouth College (one), and Yale University (one). Three are also in the possession of the University of California system, with one each at UC Berkeley, UCLA, and UC Irvine. In Canada, the University of Toronto's Thomas Fisher Rare Book Library owns a copy and the University of British Columbia another. Loyola Marymount University in Los Angeles holds a copy within the Department of Archives and Special Collections. Ireland's only copy resides in the Old Library at Trinity College Dublin.

A number of copies are held by public libraries. In the United States, the New York Public Library owns six copies. The Boston Public Library, Free Library of Philadelphia (a copy previously owned by John Milton and containing notes in his handwriting), The Dallas Public Library and the Buffalo & Erie County Public Library each hold one copy. In the UK, the Library of Birmingham owns one copy.

Additional copies are owned by the Huntington Library (four), The Shakespeare Centre (three), the Victoria and Albert Museum (three), the Sutro Library (two), the Morgan Library and Museum (two), the Newberry Library, the Fondation Martin Bodmer, the State Library of New South Wales, the Auckland Central City Library, Indian Institute of Technology Roorkee, and the National Library of Chile.

=== Sales and valuations ===
The First Folio is one of the most valuable printed books in the world: a copy sold at Christie's in New York in October 2001 made $6.16 million hammer price (then £3.73m). In October 2020, a copy sold by Mills College at Christie's fetched a price of $10 million, making it the most expensive work of literature ever auctioned.

Oriel College, Oxford, raised a conjectured £3.5 million from the sale of its First Folio to Sir Paul Getty in 2003.

To commemorate the 400th anniversary of Shakespeare's death in 2016, the Folger Shakespeare Library toured some of its 82 First Folios for display in all 50 U.S. states, Washington, D.C., and Puerto Rico.

=== Discoveries of previously unknown Folios ===
In 2003, Anthony West identified a book previously thought to be a Second Folio in the collection of Craven Museum in Skipton, North Yorkshire, as a First Folio. It had been donated to the museum in 1936 by a local mill owner. This copy is missing its introductory pages and all the comedies.

On 13 July 2006, a complete copy of the First Folio owned by Dr Williams's Library was auctioned at Sotheby's auction house. The book, which was in its original 17th-century binding, sold for £2,808,000, less than Sotheby's top estimate of £3.5 million. This copy is one of only about 40 remaining complete copies (most of the existing copies are incomplete); only one other copy of the book remains in private ownership.

On 11 July 2008, it was reported that a copy stolen from Durham University, in 1998 had been recovered after being submitted for valuation at the Folger Shakespeare Library. News reports estimated the folio's value at anywhere from £250,000 in total for the First Folio and all the other books and manuscripts stolen (BBC News, 1998), up to $30 million (The New York Times, 2008). Although the book, once the property of John Cosin, the Bishop of Durham, was returned to the library, it had been mutilated and was missing its cover and title page. The folio was returned to public display on 19 June 2010 after its 12-year absence. Fifty-three-year-old Raymond Scott received an eight-year prison sentence for handling stolen goods, but was acquitted of the theft itself. A July 2010 BBC programme about the affair, Stealing Shakespeare, portrayed Scott as a fantasist and petty thief. In 2012, Scott killed himself in his prison cell.

In November 2014, a previously unknown First Folio was found in a public library in Saint-Omer, Pas-de-Calais, France, where it had lain for 200 years. Confirmation of its authenticity came from Eric Rasmussen of the University of Nevada, Reno, one of the foremost authorities on Shakespeare. The title page and introductory material are missing. The name "Neville", written on the first surviving page, may indicate that it once belonged to Edward Scarisbrick, who fled England due to anti-Catholic repression, attended the Jesuit Saint-Omer College, and was known to use that alias.

In March 2016, Christie's announced that a previously unrecorded copy once owned by 19th-century collector Sir George Shuckburgh-Evelyn would be auctioned on 25 May 2016. According to the Antiques Trade Gazette, an American collector paid £1,600,000 for it; the buyer also successfully bid on copies of the second, third and fourth folios.

In April 2016, another new discovery was announced: a First Folio found in Mount Stuart House on the Isle of Bute, Scotland, that originally belonged to Isaac Reed. It was authenticated by Emma Smith of Oxford University. Smith has cautioned about overstating the importance of the First Folio.

== See also ==
- Books in the United Kingdom
- List of most expensive books and manuscripts

== Bibliography ==
- Ackroyd, Peter (2006). Shakespeare: The Biography. London: Vintage. ISBN 978-0-7493-8655-9.
- "Rare Shakespeare folio goes on display in Skipton". BBC News. 21 March 2011.
- "Shakespeare folio dealer Raymond Scott killed himself". BBC News. 9 December 2013.
- "Shakespeare Folio found in French library". BBC News. 26 November 2014.
- Bevington, David (2002). Shakespeare. Oxford: Blackwell. ISBN 0-631-22719-9.
- Chambers, E. K. (1930). William Shakespeare: A Study of Facts and Problems. Vol. I. Oxford: Clarendon Press. ISBN 0-19-811774-4. OCLC 353406.
- "Wliiam Shakespeare's First Folio Sells for $6,166,000 at Christie's New York, Establishing a World Auction Record for any 17th Century Book" (Press release). Christie's. 8 October 2001. Archived from the original on April 2, 2018.
- Collins, Paul (17 July 2008). "Folioed Again: Why Shakespeare is the world's worst stolen treasure". Slate.
- Coughlan, Sean (7 April 2016). "Shakespeare First Folio discovered on Scottish island". BBC News.
- Edmondson, Paul (2015). "His editors John Heminges and Henry Condell". In Edmondson, Paul; Wells, Stanley (eds.). The Shakespeare Circle: An Alternative Biography. Cambridge: Cambridge University Press. pp. 315–328. doi:10.1017/CBO9781107286580.030. ISBN 978-1107286580 – via Cambridge Core.
- Erne, Lukas (2013). Shakespeare as Literary Dramatist (2nd ed.). Cambridge: Cambridge University Press. doi:10.1017/CBO9781139342445. ISBN 978-1139342445 – via Cambridge Core.
- Evans, G. Blakemore, ed. (1974). The Riverside Shakespeare. Houghton Mifflin. ISBN 978-0395044025.
- Farber, Robert D. (3 October 2013). "Shakespeare collection". Brandeis Special Collections Spotlight. Brandeis University.
- Fessenden, Marissa (7 January 2016). "Shakespeare's First Folio Goes on Tour in the U.S." Smithsonian Magazine.
- Finnigan, Lexi (17 March 2016). "'Holy Grail' of Shakespeare's first Four Folios set to go on sale in London". The Telegraph. Archived from the original on 17 March 2016.
- "First Folios at the Folger". Folgerpedia. Folger Shakespeare Library. n.d.
- Greenblatt, Stephen (2005). Will in the World: How Shakespeare Became Shakespeare. London: Pimlico. ISBN 978-0712600989.
- Greenblatt, Stephen (21 April 2016). "How Shakespeare Lives Now". The New York Review of Books. Vol. 63, no. 7. ISSN 0028-7504.
- "Ten books that changed the world". The Guardian. 7 August 2015.
- "Shakespeare first folio discovered at stately home on Scottish island". The Guardian. 7 April 2016.
- Halliday, F. E. (1964). A Shakespeare Companion 1564–1964. Baltimore: Penguin. LCCN 64005260. OCLC 683393. OL 16529592M.
- Higgins, B.D.R. (2016). "Printing the First Folio". In Smith, Emma (ed.). The Cambridge Companion to Shakespeare's First Folio. Cambridge Companions to Shakespeare. Cambridge: Cambridge University Press. pp. 30–47. doi:10.1017/CCO9781316162552.004. ISBN 978-1316162552 – via Cambridge Core.
- Honan, Park (1998). Shakespeare: A Life. Oxford: Clarendon Press. ISBN 978-0198117926.
- Iggulden, Amy (14 July 2006). "Shakespeare First Folio sells for £2.8m". The Telegraph.
- Lyons, Tara L. (2016). "Shakespeare in Print Before 1623". In Smith, Emma (ed.). The Cambridge Companion to Shakespeare's First Folio. Cambridge Companions to Shakespeare. Cambridge: Cambridge University Press. pp. 1–17. doi:10.1017/CCO9781316162552.002. ISBN 978-1316162552 – via Cambridge Core.
- Macknight, Hugh (18 June 2010). "Stolen Shakespeare folio is given its day in court". The Independent.
- Mayer, Jean-Christophe (2016). "Early Buyers and Readers". In Smith, Emma (ed.). The Cambridge Companion to Shakespeare's First Folio. Cambridge Companions to Shakespeare. Cambridge: Cambridge University Press. pp. 103–119. doi:10.1017/CCO9781316162552.008. ISBN 978-1316162552 – via Cambridge Core.
- "Meisei University Shakespeare Collection Database". Meisei University. n.d.
- Mulholland, Rory (25 November 2014). "Shakespeare First Folio discovered in French library". The Telegraph.
- Rasmussen, Eric (2011). The Shakespeare Thefts: In Search of the First Folios. St. Martin's Press. ISBN 978-0230341203.
- Rasmussen, Eric (2016). "Publishing the First Folio". In Smith, Emma (ed.). The Cambridge Companion to Shakespeare's First Folio. Cambridge Companions to Shakespeare. Cambridge: Cambridge University Press. pp. 18–29. doi:10.1017/CCO9781316162552.003. ISBN 978-1316162552 – via Cambridge Core.
- Rasmussen, Eric; West, Anthony James, eds. (2012). The Shakespeare First Folios: A Descriptive Catalogue. Oxford: Oxford University Press. ISBN 978-0230517653.
- Rees, Jasper (30 July 2010). "Stealing Shakespeare, BBC One: Dodgy dealer, dodgy documentary". The Arts Desk.
- Schuessler, Jennifer (25 November 2014). "Shakespeare Folio Discovered in France". The New York Times.
- Smith, Emma (6 April 2016). "Vamped till ready". The Times Literary Supplement.
- Smith, Robert M. (1939). "Why a First Folio Shakespeare Remained in England". The Review of English Studies. 15 (59). Oxford University Press: 257–264. doi:10.1093/res/os-XV.59.257. eISSN 1471-6968. ISSN 0034-6551. JSTOR 509788.
- Vincent, Helen (20 April 2016). "Shakespeare's First Folio". National Library of Scotland. Archived from the original on 2018-04-02.
- Wainwright, Martin (9 July 2010). "Raymond Scott guilty of handling stolen folio of Shakespeare's plays". The Guardian.
- West, Anthony James (2003). A New Worldwide Census of First Folios. The Shakespeare First Folio: The History of the Book. Vol. II. Oxford: Oxford University Press. ISBN 978-0198187684.
- "Shakespeare's First Folio". British Library. n.d. Archived from the original on 2022-07-05.
