= Saint-Omer =

Saint-Omer Saint-Onmé (Picard) Sint-Omaars
- Subprefecture and commune
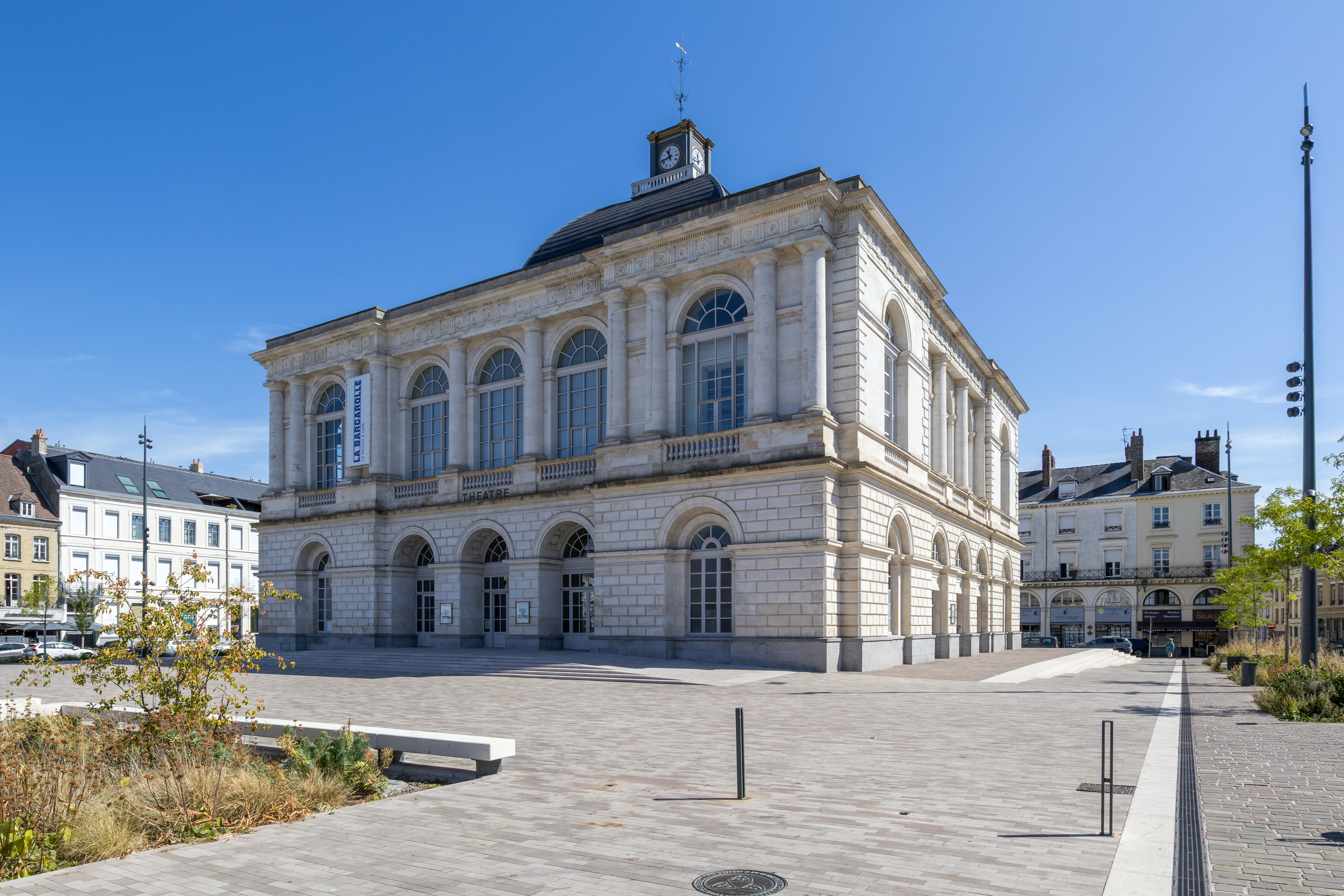
- The theatre « le moulin à café » (the coffee grinder)

- Coat of arms
- Location of Saint-Omer
- Location within France Location within Hauts-de-France
- Coordinates: 50°44′46″N 2°15′42″E
- Country: France
- Region: Hauts-de-France
- Department: Pas-de-Calais
- Arrondissement: Saint-Omer
- Canton: Saint-Omer
- Intercommunality: CA Pays de Saint-Omer

Government
  - Mayor (2020–2026): François Decoster
- Area^{1}: 16.4 km^{2} (6.3 sq mi)
- Elevation: 6 m (20 ft)
- Highest elevation: 27 m (89 ft)
- Lowest elevation: 0 m (0 ft)
- Population (2023): 14,382
  - Density: 877/km^{2} (2,270/sq mi)
- Time zone: UTC+01:00 (CET)
  - Summer (DST): UTC+02:00 (CEST)
- INSEE/Postal code: 62765 /62500
- Website: www.ville-saint-omer.fr
- ^{1} French Land Register data, which excludes lakes, ponds, glaciers > 1 km^{2} (0.386 sq mi or 247 acres) and river estuaries.

Saint-Omer (French pronunciation: [sɛ̃t‿omɛʁ]; West Flemish: Sint-Omaars; Picard: Saint-Onmé) is a commune and sub-prefecture of the Pas-de-Calais department in France.

It is 68 km (42 mi) west-northwest of Lille on the railway to Calais, and is located in the province of Artois. The town is named after Saint Audomar, who brought Christianity to the area.

The canalised section of the river Aa begins at Saint-Omer, reaching the North Sea at Gravelines in northern France. Below its walls, the Aa connects with the Neufossé Canal, which ends at the river Lys.

== History ==
Saint-Omer first appeared in the writings during the 7th century under the name of Sithiu (Sithieu or Sitdiu), around the Saint-Bertin abbey founded on the initiative of Audomar (Odemaars or Omer).

Omer, bishop of Thérouanne, in the 7th century established the Abbey of Saint Bertin, from which that of Notre-Dame was an offshoot. Rivalry and dissension, which lasted till the French Revolution, soon sprang up between the two monasteries, becoming especially virulent when in 1559 Saint-Omer became a bishopric and Notre-Dame was raised to the rank of cathedral.

In the 9th century, the village that grew up round the monasteries took the name of Saint-Omer. The Vikings laid the place to waste about 860 and 880. Ten years later the town and monastery had built fortified walls and were safe from their attack. Situated on the borders of territories frequently disputed by French, Flemish, English and Spaniards, for most of its history Saint-Omer continued to be subject to sieges and military invasions.

In 932 Arnulf of Flanders conquered the County of Artois and Saint-Omer (Sint-Omaars in Dutch) became part of the County of Flanders for the next three centuries. In 1071 Philip I and the teenage Count Arnulf III of Flanders were defeated at Saint-Omer by Arnulf's uncle and former protector, Robert the Frisian, who subsequently became the Count of Flanders until his death in 1093.

Along with its textile industry, St-Omer thrived in the 12th and 13th century. In 1127 the town received a communal charter from the count, William Clito, becoming the first town in West Flanders with city rights. Later on the city lost its leading position in the textile industry to Bruges. After the mysterious death of Count Baldwin I, the County of Flanders was weakened. In 1212 Philip II of France captured Baldwin's daughter Joan and her husband Ferdinand, Count of Flanders and forced them to sign the Treaty of Pont-à-Vendin, in which Artois was yielded to France. Ferdinand did not take this lying down, and allied with Emperor Otto IV and John, King of England, he battled Philip II at Bouvines, but was defeated. Despite the political separation for the next 170 years, the city remained part of the economic network of Flanders.

In 1340 a large battle was fought in the town's suburbs between an Anglo-Flemish army and a French one under Eudes IV, Duke of Burgundy, in which the Anglo-Flemish force was forced to withdraw. From 1384, St-Omer was part of the Burgundian Netherlands, from 1482 of the Habsburg Netherlands and from 1581 to 1678 of the Spanish Netherlands.

The French made futile attempts against the town between 1551 and 1596. During the Thirty Years' War, the French attacked in 1638 (under Cardinal Richelieu) and again in 1647. Finally in 1677, after a seventeen-day siege, Louis XIV forced the town to capitulate. The peace of Nijmegen signed in the fall of 1678 permanently confirmed the conquest and its annexation by France.

The College of Saint Omer was established in 1593 by Fr Robert Persons SJ, an English Jesuit, to educate English Roman Catholics. After the Protestant Reformation, England had established penal laws against Roman Catholic education in the country. The college operated in Saint-Omer until 1762, when it migrated to Bruges and then to Liège in 1773. It finally moved to England in 1794, settling at Stonyhurst, Lancashire. Former students of the College of Saint Omer include John Carroll, his brother Daniel and his cousin Charles.

During World War I on 8 October 1914, the British Royal Flying Corps (RFC) arrived in Saint-Omer and a headquarters was established at the aerodrome next to the local race course. For the following four years, Saint-Omer was a focal point for all RFC operations in the field. Although most squadrons only used Saint-Omer as a transit camp before moving on to other locations, the base grew in importance as it increased its logistic support to the RFC. Many Royal Air Force squadrons can trace their roots to formation at Saint-Omer during this period. Among which are No. IX Squadron RAF which was formed at Saint-Omer, 14 December 1914 and No. 16 Squadron RAF which was formed on 10 February 1915.

During World War II, the Luftwaffe used the airfield. When the RAF's legless Battle of Britain ace, Douglas Bader, parachuted from his Spitfire during an aerial battle over France, he was initially treated at a Luftwaffe hospital at Saint-Omer. He had lost an artificial leg when bailing out, and the RAF dropped him another one during a bombing raid.

== Population ==
Historical population
Year	Pop.	±% p.a.
1968	18,205	—
1975	16,932	−1.03%
1982	15,415	−1.33%
1990	14,434	−0.82%
1999	15,747	+0.97%
2007	14,848	−0.73%
2012	13,881	−1.34%
2017	14,782	+1.27%
2023	14,382	−0.46%
Source: INSEE

== Main sites ==
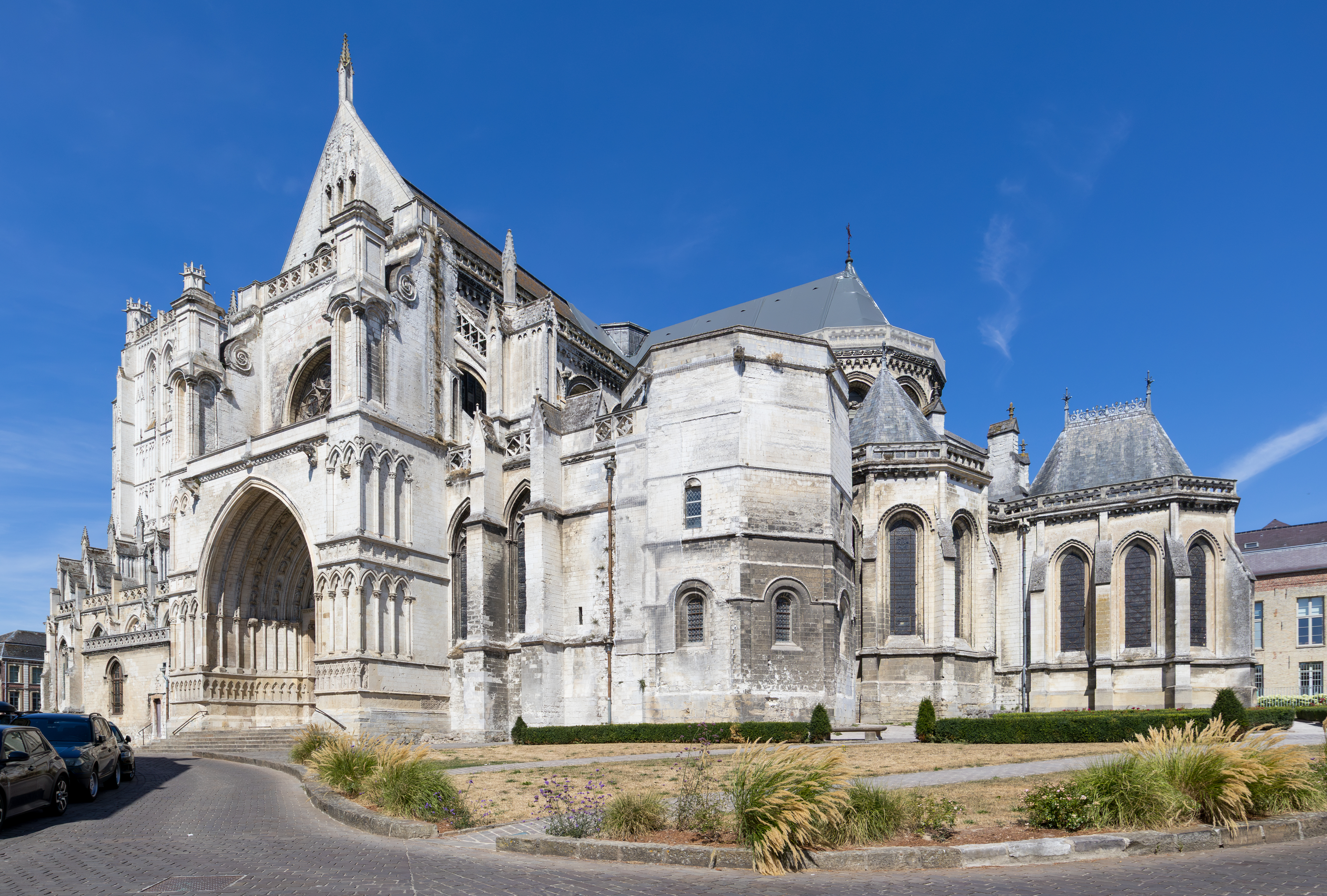
Cathedral

The fortifications (which had been improved by Vauban in the 17th century) were demolished during the last decade of the 19th century, and boulevards and new thoroughfares built in their place. A section of the ramparts remains intact on the western side of the town, converted into a park known as the jardin public (public garden). There are two harbours outside the city and another within its limits. Saint-Omer has wide streets and spacious squares.

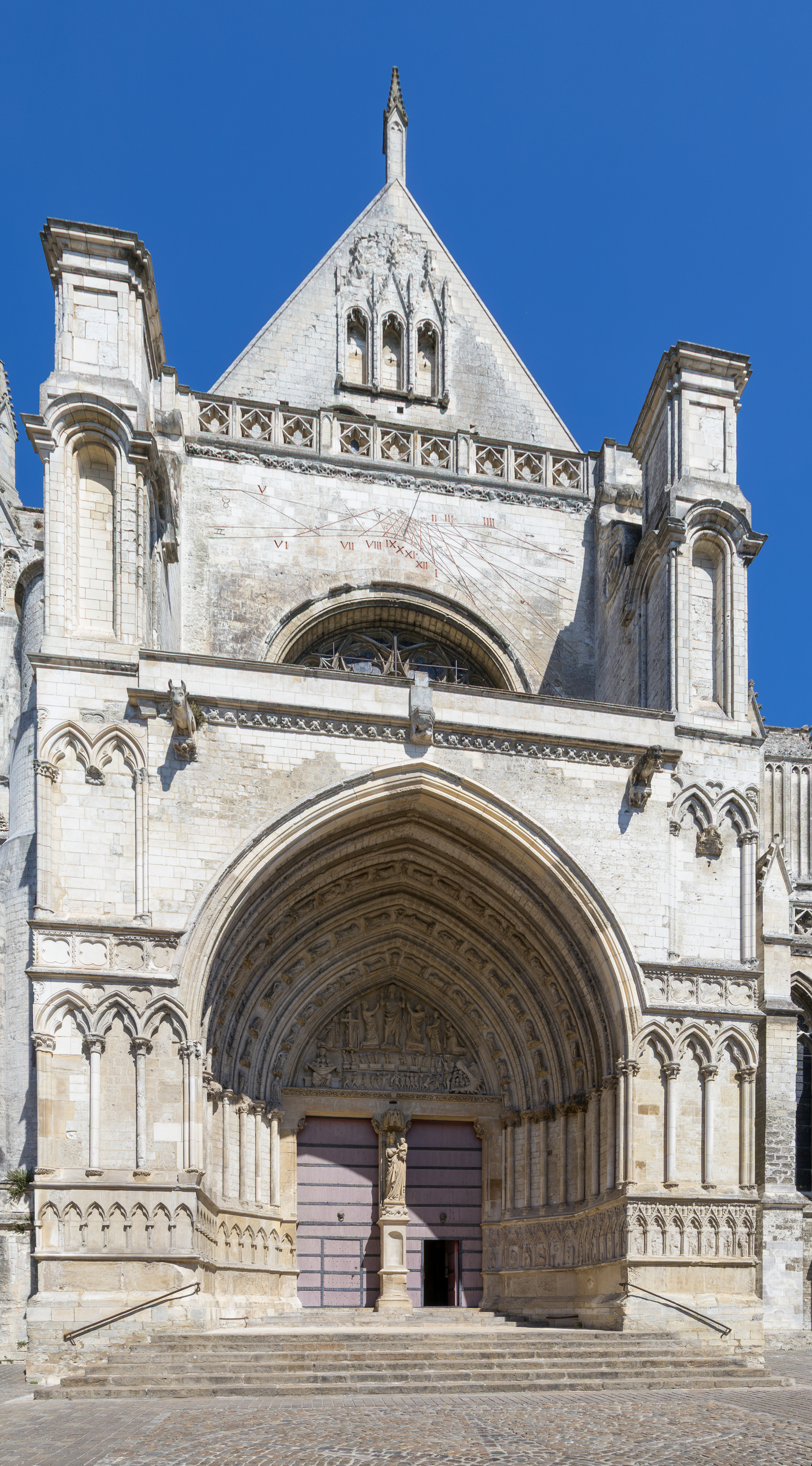
The sundial on the south portal of the cathedral

The old cathedral was constructed almost entirely in the 13th, 14th and centuries. A heavy square tower finished in 1499 surmounts the west portal. The church contains Biblical paintings, a colossal statue of Christ seated between the Virgin Mary and St John (13th century, originally belonging to the cathedral of Thérouanne and presented by the emperor Charles V), the cenotaph of Saint Audomare (Omer) (13th century) and numerous ex-votos. The richly decorated chapel in the transept contains a wooden figure of the Virgin (12th century), the object of pilgrimages. Of St Bertin church, part of the abbey (built between 1326 and 1520 on the site of previous churches) where Childeric III retired to end his days, there remain some arches and a lofty tower, which serve to adorn a public garden. Several other churches or convent chapels are of interest, among them St Sepulchre (14th century), which has a stone spire and stained-glass windows. The cathedral has a huge Cavaillé-Coll organ, which is still playable.

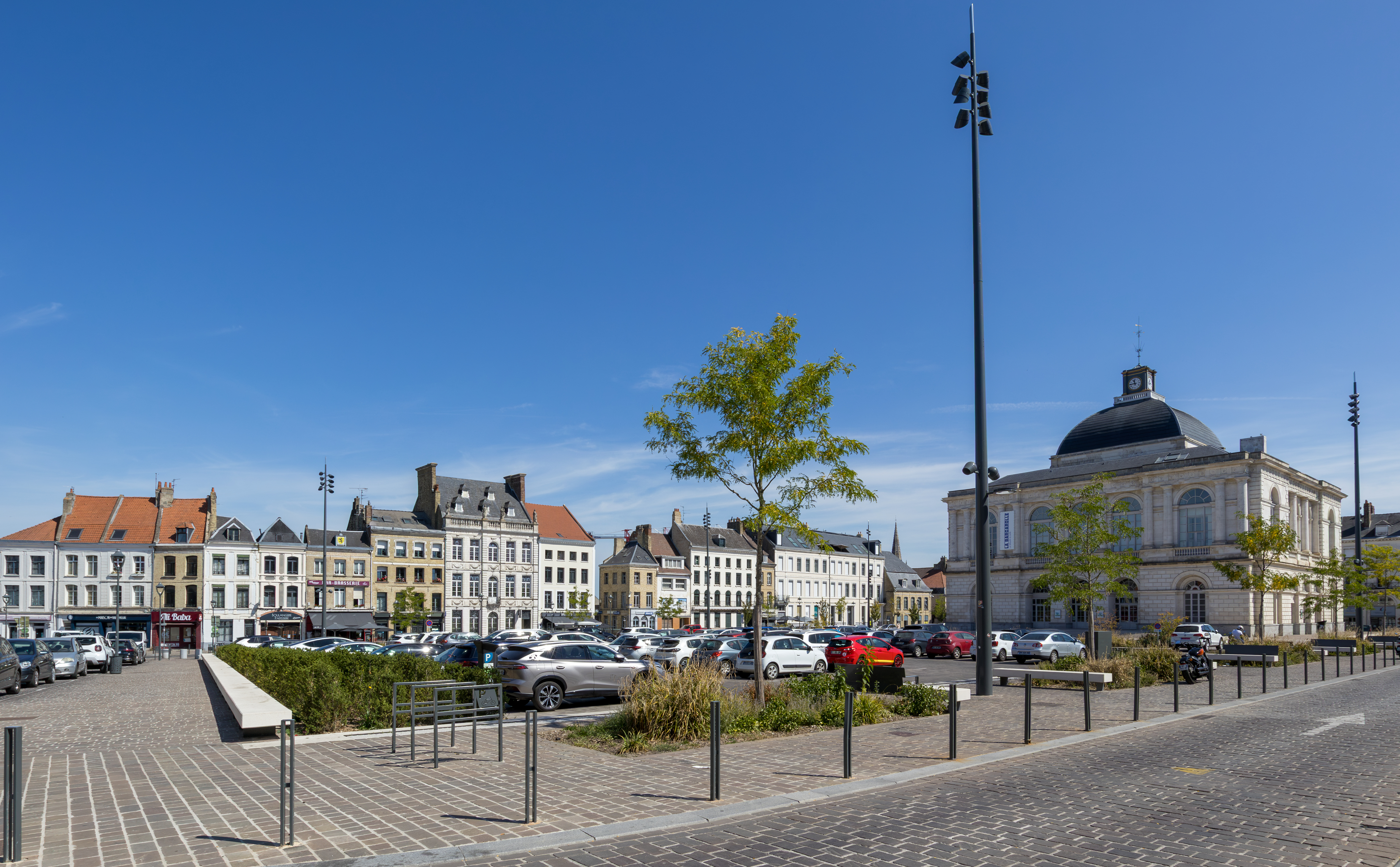
Main square and theater (the old town hall)

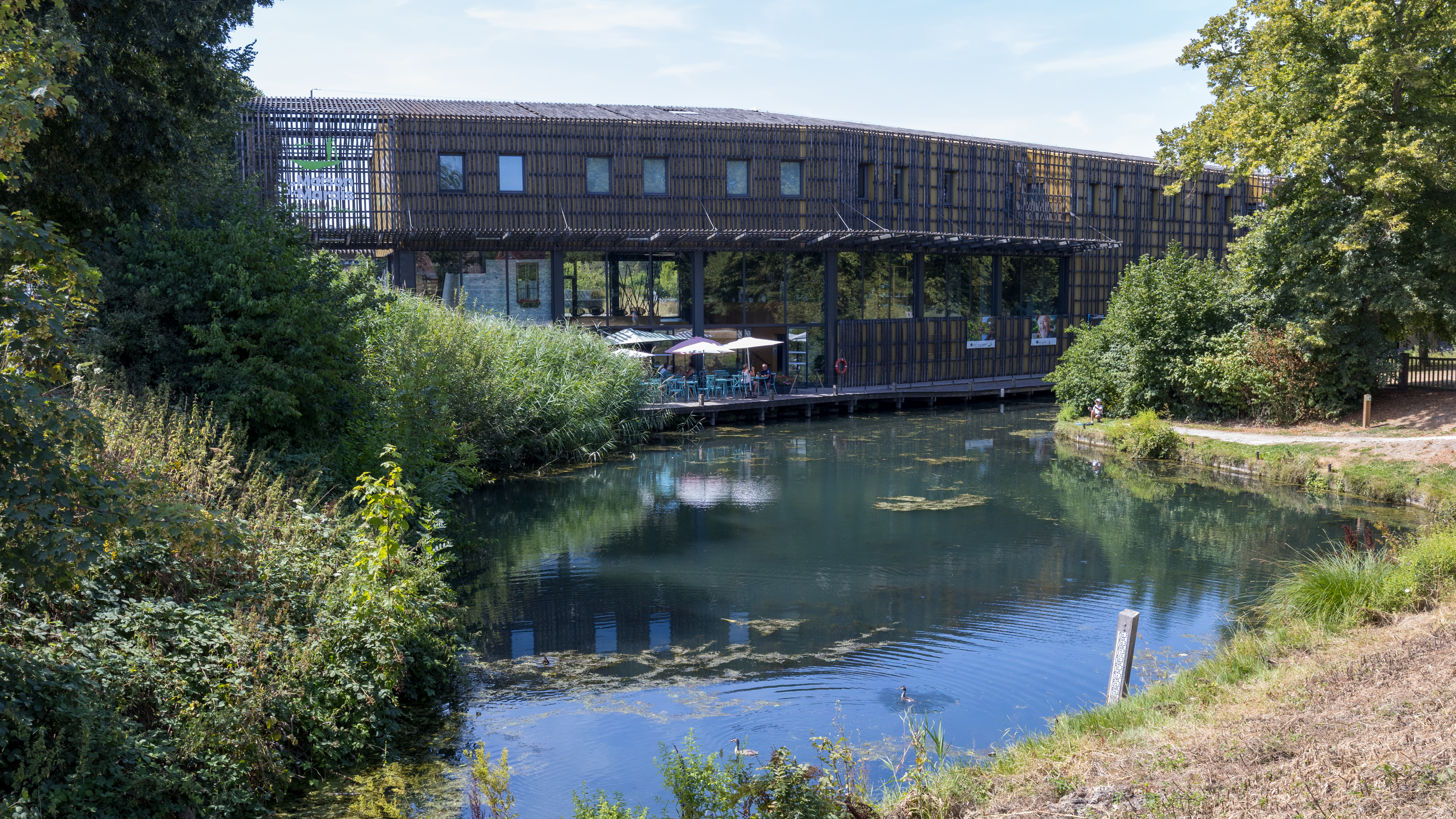
The house of the Marsh

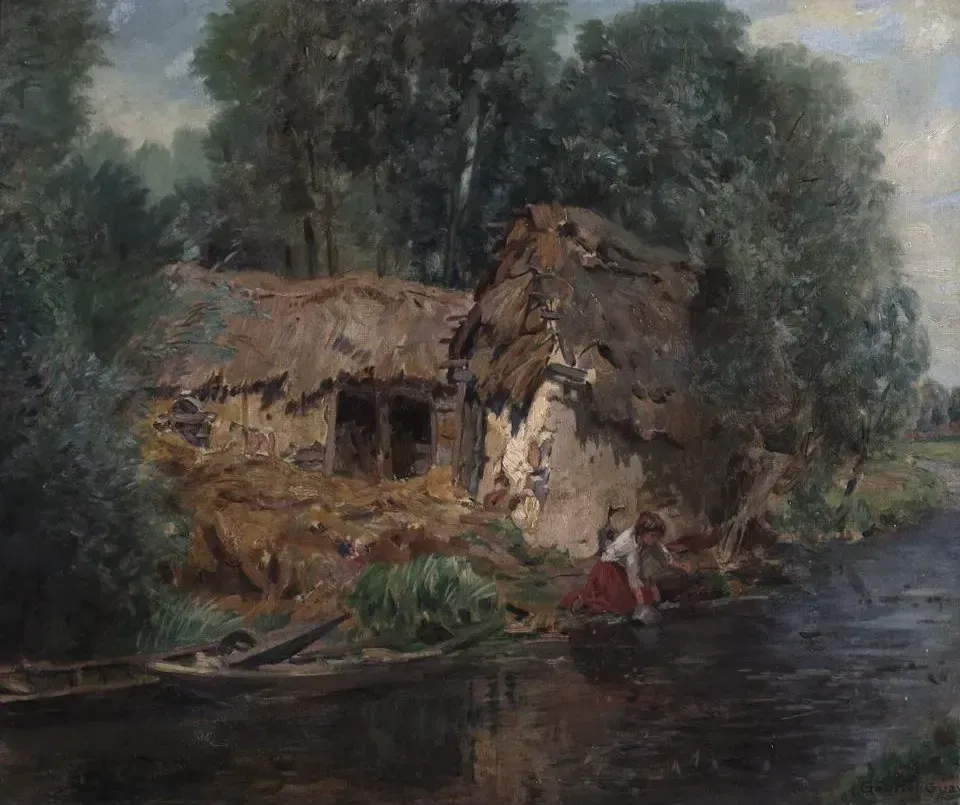
Gabriel Guay, Young Girl Gathering Water at Saint-Omer, c. 1895

A collection of records, a picture gallery, and a theatre are all situated in the town hall, built of the materials from the abbey of St Bertin. Several houses date from the 16th and 17th centuries. The Hôtel Colbert, once the royal lodging, is now occupied by an archaeological museum. The military hospital occupies the former English College, founded by the English Jesuits in 1593. It is now part of the Lycée Alexandre Ribot. Besides the Lycée, there are schools of music and of art.

The old episcopal palace adjoining the cathedral is used as a court-house. Saint-Omer is the seat of a court of assizes and tribunals, of a chamber of commerce, and of a board of trade arbitration.

Until 1942, the chief statue in the town was that of Jacqueline Robin, who, according to the mythology, had helped the town resist a siege by Marlborough and Prince Eugene of Savoy in 1711. However, the statue disappeared during the German occupation, taken to be melted down. Today, the remaining statues of people associated with the city:

- L'abbé Suger
- Pierre Alexandre Monsigny
- Prince Ferdinand-Philippe d'Orléans, duc d'Orléans

== Economy ==
Over the better part of the last century, the economy of Saint Omer had depended largely on one enterprise, that of the glass maker Arc International (situated in the neighbouring town of Arques). The economy of Saint Omer has diversified over the course of the past 50 years. Aside from the glass works at Arc International, major employers in the area include:

- Alphaglass
- Brasserie de Saint-Omer
- Brasserie Goudale
- Les Fromageurs de Saint Omer
- La Societe des Eaux de Saint Omer
- Centre Hospitalier Région de Saint-Omer
- Bonduelle

The creation of new enterprises has seen a steady growth in the past 10 years with 2 147 enterprises as of 2020. In the town itself, there are a number of retail shops and services, as well as a large selection of restaurants, brasseries and cafés.

Historically, the economy of Saint Omer had also developed in the wetlands outside the city, known locally as le marais, which remains one of the last cultivated marais in France. The Marais Audomarois is currently listed as a UNESCO heritage site. The agricultural output from this area continues year-round, thanks to the mild climate and fertile soil. Among the specialties, cauliflower is a notable product and is exported throughout Europe. Other crops for which the area is known are carrots, endive, and watercress.

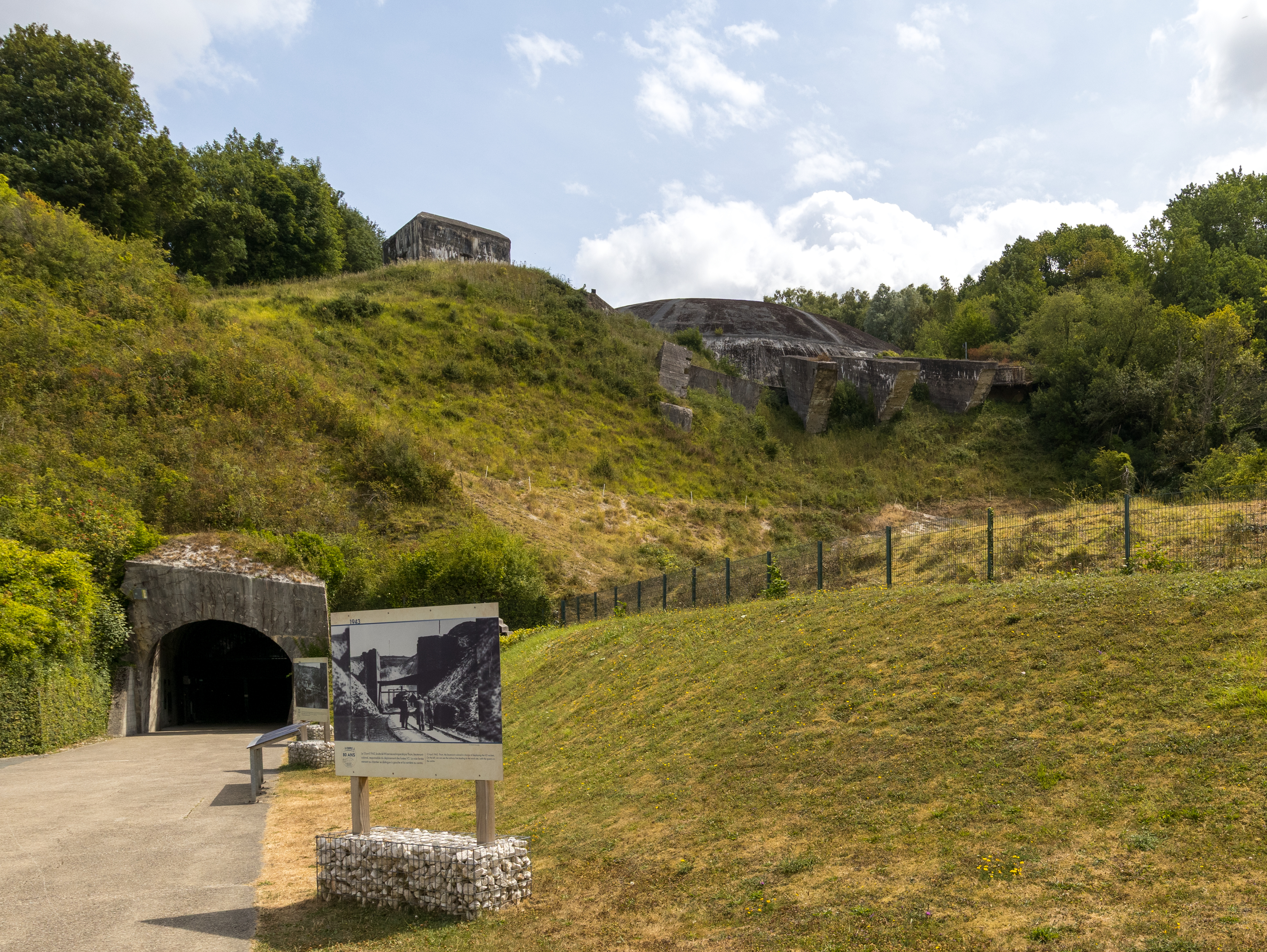
The dome (History Center 39-45) in Wizernes.

== Nearby areas ==
At the end of the marshes, on the borders of the forest of Clairmarais, are the ruins of the abbey founded in 1140 by Thierry of Alsace. Thomas Becket sought refuge here in 1165. To the south of Saint-Omer, on a hill commanding the Aa, lies the camp of Helfaut, often called the camp of Saint-Omer.

On the Canal de Neufossé, near the town, is the Ascenseur des Fontinettes, a hydraulic lift which once raised and lowered canal boats to and from the Aa, over a height of 12m. This was replaced in 1967 by a large lock.

During the Second World War, the area was chosen as a launch site for the V-2 rocket. The nearby blockhouse at Éperlecques and underground complex of La Coupole were built for this purpose and are open to the public.

== Culture ==
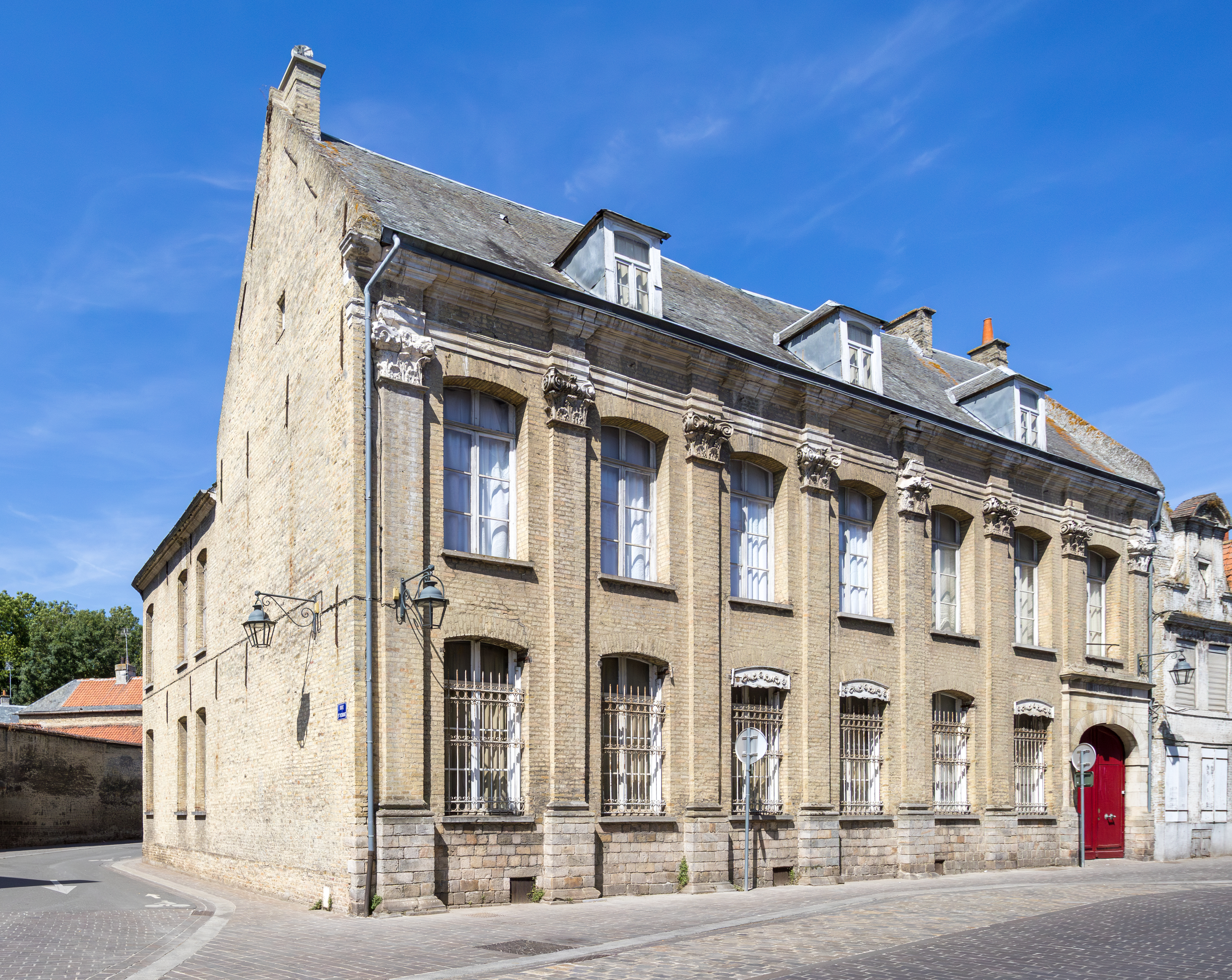
Former Henri Dupuis Museum

Saint-Omer is diverse in ethnic, linguistic and immigrant communities. Haut-Pont is a heavily West Flemish section of Saint-Omer which has Flemish/Belgian roots. In the Southeast of the cathedral is a newly formed Turkish neighborhood; the majority of the local Turks are members of the Christian faith (i.e. Greek Orthodox or of ethnic Greek origin, Eastern Rite and Catholic converts), who arrived in France after World War I to escape religious persecution. Genealogists have noted the many cultural influences in the area, including British, Dutch, German, Austrian, Hungarian, Czech, Slovak and Polish. It is believed the region's mining and glass manufacturing industries contributed to a revived post-war (WWI and WWII era) population.

=== Public library ===
The public library of Saint-Omer holds, in its rare books section, one of the three French copies of the 42-line Gutenberg Bible, originally from the library of the Abbey of Saint Bertin. The other two copies are in Paris. In November 2014, a previously unknown Shakespeare First Folio was found in a public library in Saint-Omer. The book had lain undisturbed in the library for 200 years. The first 30 pages were missing. A number of experts assisted in authenticating the folio, which also had a name, "Neville", written on the first surviving page, indicating that it may have once been owned by Edward Scarisbrick. Scarisbrick had fled England due to anti-Catholic repression and attended Saint-Omer College, a Jesuit institution. Confirmation of its authenticity came from a professor at the University of Nevada and one of the world's foremost authorities on Shakespeare, Eric Rasmussen, who happened to be in London at the time. The only other known copy of a First Folio in France is in the National Library in Paris.

=== Sports ===
St. Omer was the host of the 2022 Canoe Polo world championships.

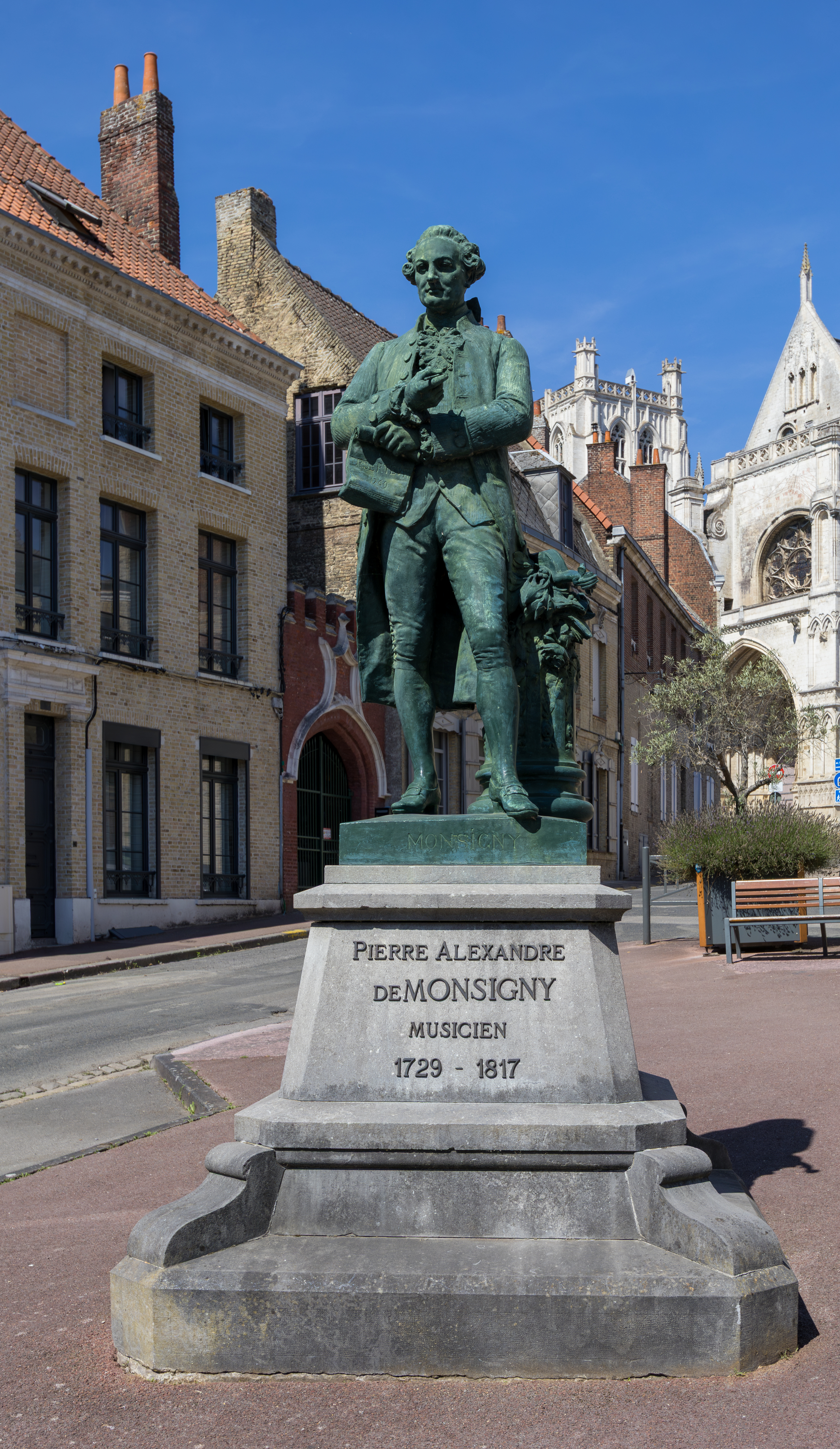
Pierre-Alexandre Monsigny

== Notable people ==
- Omer, ou Audomarus ou Audemer (600 – † 670), monk, named bishop of Therouanne, canonised under the name of Saint Omer
- Lambert (late 11th – early 11th century), canon of Saint-Omer, author of the Liber floridus
- Godfrey de Saint-Omer, founding member of the Knights Templar in 1118
- Charles Blondin (28 February 1824 – 22 February 1897), tightrope walker and acrobat
- Hippolyte Carnot (1801–1888), statesman
- Antoine Davion (c. 1664–1726), Mississippi missionary, 1698–1725
- Joseph Liouville (1809–1882), mathematician
- Robert Parsons (1546–1610), Jesuit founder of the English Jesuit College of Saint-Omer
- Jean Titelouze (c. 1562/3–1633), organist and composer, first composer of the French organ school
- Claude Dausque (1566–1644), humanist, scholar and canon of Tournai, considered one of the most erudite men of his time
- Françoise de Saint-Omer (1581–1642), founder of the religious order of reformed Capucins
- Pierre-Alexandre Monsigny (1729–1817), composer
- Daniel Carroll (22 July 1730 in Upper Marlboro – 4 May 1796 in Rock Creek, Maryland), one of the founders of the United States; he was one of two Catholics who signed the Constitution of the United States. He had studied at the English Jesuit College of Saint Omer.
- John Carroll (born 8 January 1735 in Upper Marlboro, England – 3 December 1815 in Baltimore), an American Jesuit priest who had studied at the English Jesuit College in Saint Omer. He was the 1st bishop in the United States (the diocese of Baltimore) and he founded Georgetown University.
- Charles Carroll of Carrollton (19 September 1737 – 14 November 1832), delegate to the Continental Congress, senator from Maryland. He was the only Catholic to sign the Declaration of Independence. Like his cousins, he also studied at the Jesuit College in Saint Omer.
- Albert Louis Valentin Taviel (1767–1831), born in Saint-Omer, died in Paris, he was a general of the French Revolution and of the Empire.
- Pierre Alexandre Joseph Allent (1772–1837), born in Saint Omer, he was a general of the French Revolution and of the Empire.
- Martin Charles Gobrecht (1772–1845), born in Cassel (Flanders) and died in Saint-Omer, he was a general of the French Revolution and of the Empire.
- Eustache-Louis-Joseph Toulotte (1773–1860), French revolutionary and writer
- Eugène Casimir Lebreton (1791–1876), born in Saint Omer, he served in the French army under the 1st Empire and later became a politician.
- Joseph Bienaimé Caventou (born 1795 in Saint-Omer, died 1887 in Paris), chemist, pharmacist, co-discoverer of quinine
- Émile Lefranc (27 August 1798 – 18..), born in Saint-Omer. Historian, geographer and author of school books. He was an associate professor at the university and also translated from ancient Greek into French and wrote in Latin.
- Lazare Hippolyte Carnot (6 April 1801 – 16 March 1888 in Paris), French politician, born in Saint-Omer.
- Louis Noël (9 February 1807 in Saint-Pierre-lez-Calais – 18 February 1875 in Saint-Omer), sculptor
- Alfred Frédéric Philippe Auguste Napoléon Ameil (8 November 1807 – 27 March 1886 in Versailles), major general in the French army, born in Saint-Omer.
- Louis Martel (politician) (13 September 1813 in Saint-Omer – 4 March 1892 in Évreux), president of the Senate in France, minsute of Justice
- Louis-François-Joseph Deschamps de Pas (25 June 1816 in Saint-Omer – 1 March 1890 in the same city), engineer and archaeologist. He published several important works concerning the archaeology in and around Saint Omer.
- François Chifflart (25 March 1825 in Saint-Omer – 19 March 1901 in Paris), painter, illustrator and etcher
- Alphonse de Neuville (31 May 1836 – 18 May 1885), painter. He was a student of Delacroix.
- Alexandre Ribot (7 February 1842 in Saint Omer – 13 January 1923 in Paris), statesman, four times prime minister
- Tanguy Malmanche (7 September 1875 – 20 March 1953), French writer involved in the revival of Breton culture
- Éric Morena (27 October 1951 – 16 November 2019)[1], French singer. He was born in Saint-Omer and was made famous by his 1987 hit "Oh ! Mon bateau".
- Raoul Castex (27 October 1878 in Saint-Omer – 10 January 1968 in Villeneuve-de-Rivière), French Navy admiral and a military theorist. Founder of the IHEDN (Institut des hautes études de défense nationale).
- Germaine Acremant (1889–1986), writer, notable for her work Ces dames aux chapeaux vert
- Robert Ficheux (ro) (1898–2005), French historian and geographer, born in Saint-Omer. Les Palmes Académiques (17 October 1998).
- Jean-Pierre Évrard, photographer, born in 1936 in Saint Omer, whose works ar notable for being exclusively in black and white on paper
- Max Méreaux, composer, born in Saint Omer in 1946

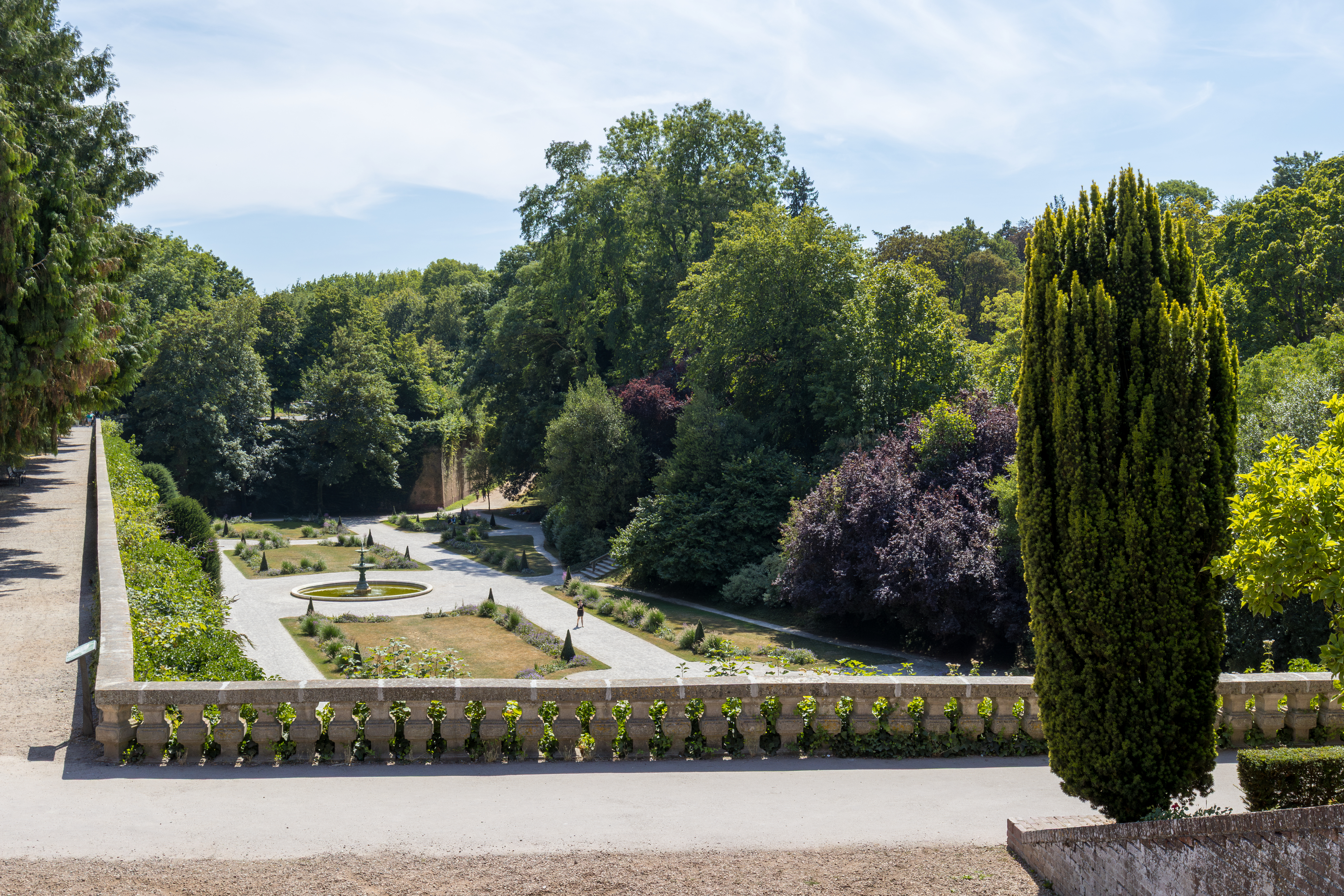
Public gardening in French in the old douves

== Twin towns ==
Saint Omer is twinned with:

- Deal, United Kingdom
- Detmold, Germany
- Ypres, Belgium
- Żagań, Poland
