= Edward Neville =

Edward Neville or Nevill may refer to:

- Sir Edward Neville (courtier) (1471–1538), English courtier
- Edward Neville (pirate) (fl. 1675–1678), English buccaneer
- Edward Neville, 3rd Baron Bergavenny (bef. 1414–1476)
- Edward Nevill, 7th Baron Bergavenny (c. 1526–1588)
- Edward Nevill, 8th Baron Bergavenny (c. 1550–1622)
- Edward Nevill, 15th Baron Bergavenny (c. 1705–1724)
- Sir Edward Neville of Grove, member of parliament for Retford

== See also ==
- Edward Neville Syfret (1889–1972), British naval officer
- Edward Neville da Costa Andrade (1887–1971), English physicist, writer, and poet
- Edward Neville (Jesuit) (1639–1708–9), English Jesuit.
