= Guzmán de Alfarache =

Novel by Mateo Alemán

The Life of Guzman de Alfarache
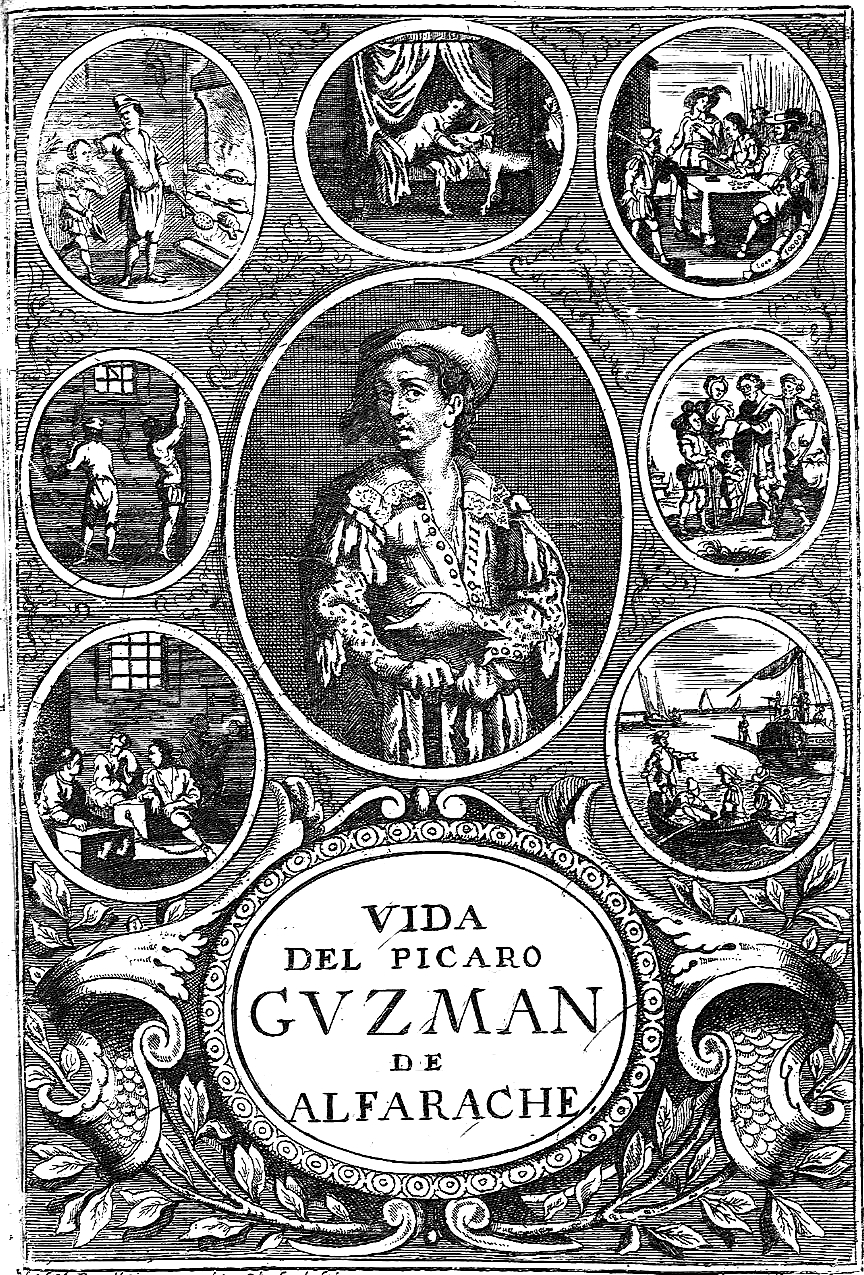
- Frontispiece of an edition of both parts, published in Antwerp by Jerónimo Verdussen in 1681 and illustrated by Gaspar Bouttats.
- Author: Mateo Alemán
- Original title: Guzmán de Alfarache
- Translator: James Mabbe
- Language: Spanish
- Genre: Picaresque novel
- Publisher: Várez de Castro, Madrid (first part); Pedro Craasbeck, Lisbon (second part)
- Publication date: 1599, 1604
- Publication place: Spain and Portugal
- English publication date: 1622

Guzmán de Alfarache (Spanish pronunciation: [ɡuθˈman de alfaˈɾatʃe]) is a picaresque novel written by Mateo Alemán and published in two parts: the first in Madrid in 1599 with the title Primera parte de Guzmán de Alfarache, and the second in 1604, titled Segunda parte de la vida de Guzmán de Alfarache, atalaya de la vida humana.

The work tells the first person adventures of a picaro, a young street urchin, as he matures into adulthood. It thus ultimately both recounts adventures and moralizes on those childish excesses. Guzmán de Alfarache, by this means, is conceived as an extensive doctrinal sermon about the sins of society, and was so received by the author's contemporaries, despite the hybrid qualities between an engaging novel and a moralizing discourse.

The novel was highly popular in its time. Many editions were published, not only in Spanish, but in French, German, English, Italian, and Latin. The English translation, by James Mabbe, was published in 1622, under alternative titles The Rogue and The Life of Guzman de Alfarache.

Apocryphal sequels and imitations were also soon produced, including one from 1602, probably written by the lawyer and poet Juan Martí, under the pseudonym Mateo Luján de Sayavedra, and published in Valencia. This was the most important and successful, due to its influence on the second part of Alemán.

== Genre ==
This novel has many similarities to other picaresque novels such as Lazarillo de Tormes. The main character is an antihero, born in infamy, and emerging into a lower-class world of delinquency and roguish misadventures. He ends up condemned as a prisoner to be a galley-slave, seeking absolution for his past life.

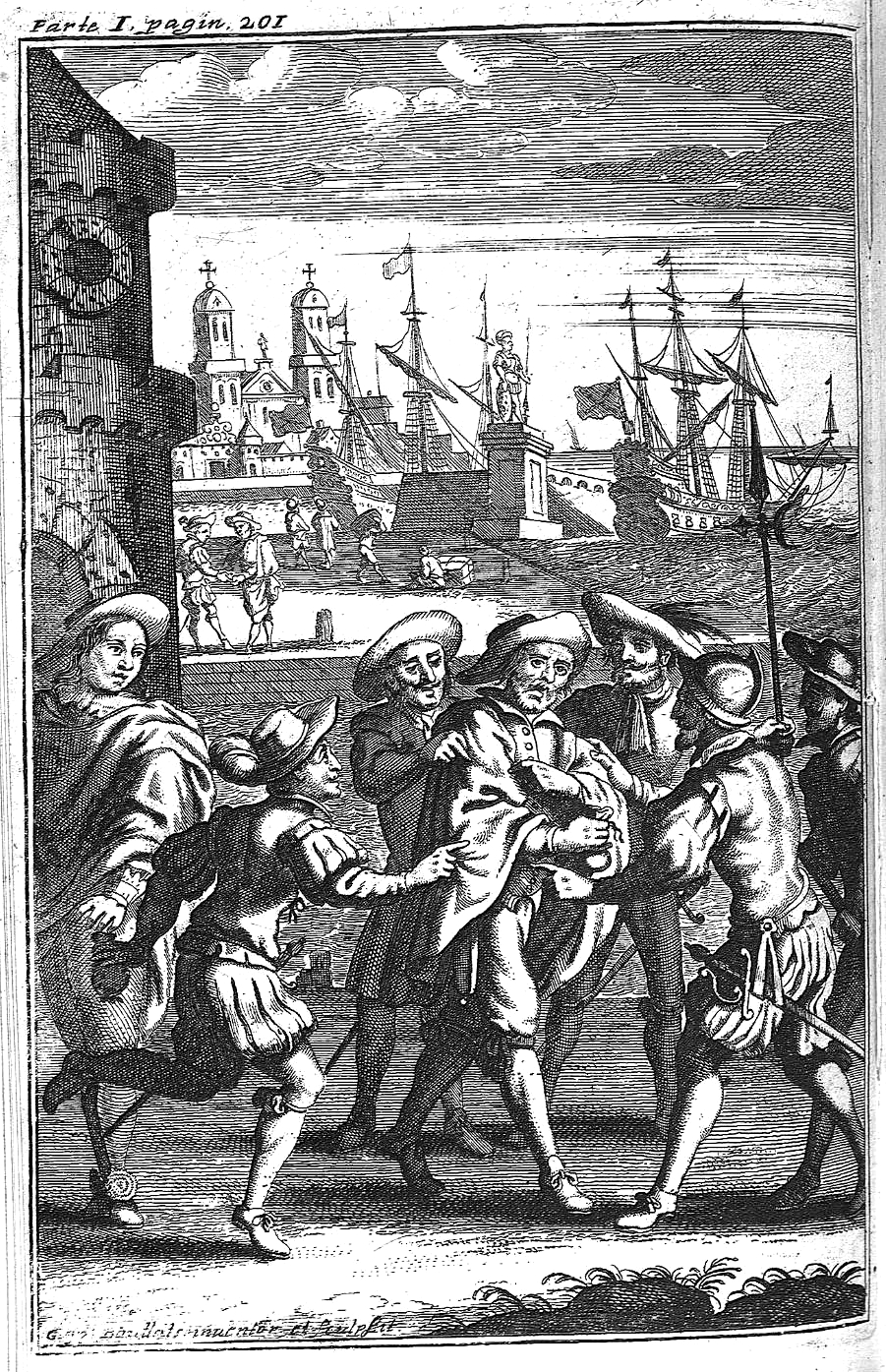
Engraving from the Antwerp edition of 1681, page 201

=== Modern editions ===
Among the most prominent modern editions are those by:

- Francisco Rico, Barcelona, Planeta, 1987. ISBN 978-84-320-3886-0
- José María Micó, Madrid, Cátedra, 1987. ISBN 978-84-376-0708-5

== Adaptations ==
In 1987, a loose film adaptation titled The Rogues was directed by Mario Monicelli.

== Notes ==
- This is an abridged entry based on the Spanish Wikipedia entry.
