= Juan José Martí =

Spanish writer (1570–1604)

Juan José Martí (c. 1570 – 22 December 1604) was a Spanish novelist, who was born at Orihuela, Province of Alicante about 1570. He graduated as bachelor of canon law at Valencia in 1591, and in 1598 took his degree as doctor of canon law; in the latter year he was appointed co-examiner in canon law at the University of Valencia, and held the post for six years. He died in Valencia, and was buried in Valencia Cathedral on 22 December 1604.

Marti joined the Valencian Academia de los noclurnos, under the name of Atrevimiento, but is best known by another pseudonym, Mateo Luján de Sayavedra, under which he issued an apocryphal continuation (1602) of Alemán's Guzmán de Alfarache (1599). Marti obtained access to Alemán's unfinished manuscript, and stole some of his ideas; this dishonesty lends point to the sarcastic congratulations which Alemán, in the genuine sequel (1604) pays to his rival's sallies: "I greatly envy them, and should be proud that they were mine." Marti's book is clever, but the circumstances in which it was produced account for its cold reception and afford presumption that the best scenes are not original.

It has been suggested that Marti is identical with Avellaneda, the writer of a spurious continuation (1614) to Don Quixote; but he died before the first part of Don Quixote was published (1605).
