= Brasserie de Saint-Omer =

French brewery

Coordinates: 50.7555°N 2.254°E

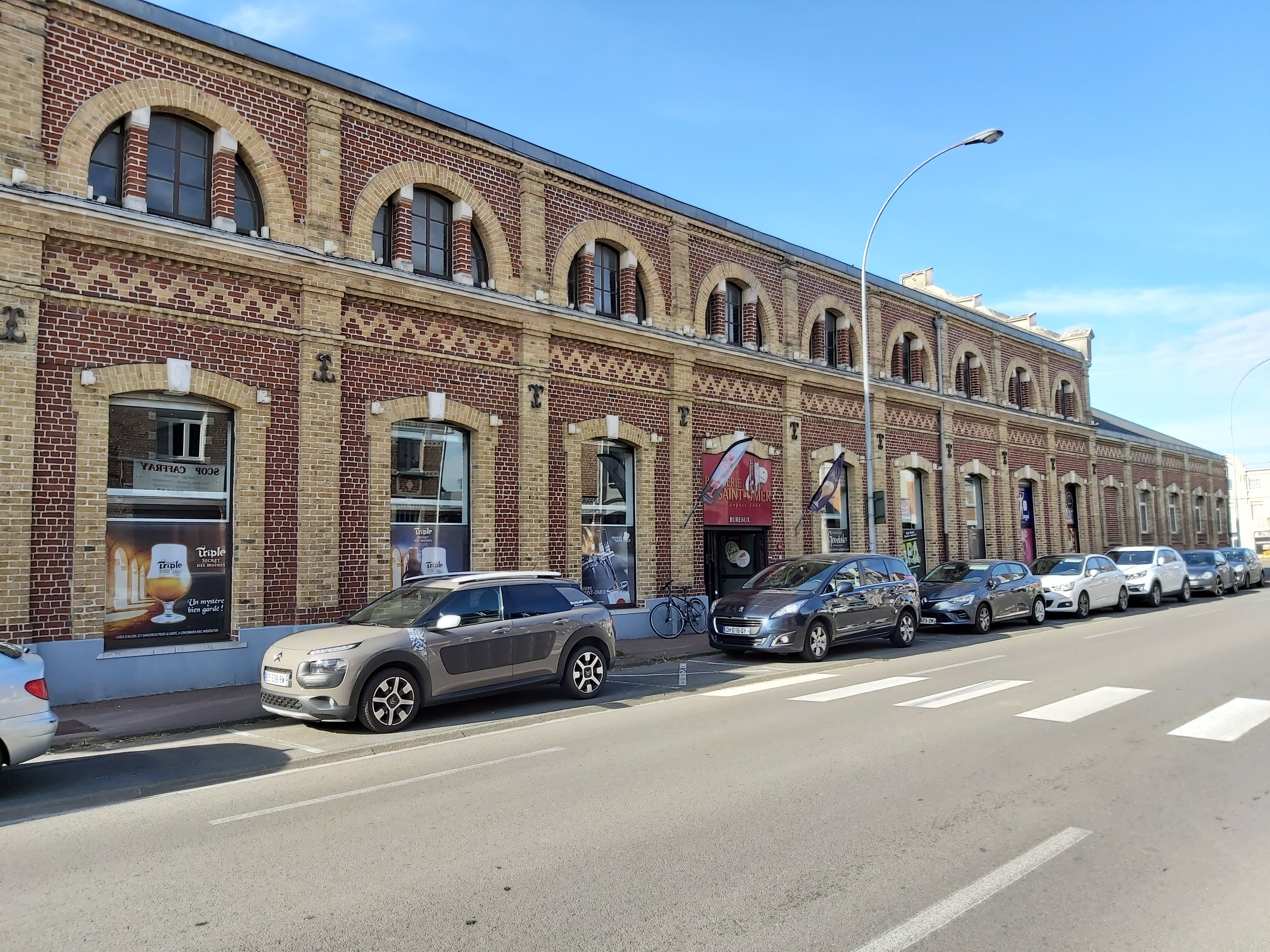
The brewery anno 2020

Brasserie de Saint-Omer is a French brewery in Saint-Omer, in the Pas-de-Calais department, situated in the Nord-Pas-de-Calais region. It is one of the two big breweries left in the Nord-Pas-de-Calais.

== Presentation ==
The Brasserie de Saint-Omer produces about 2 million hectolitres of beer a year, so it is the first independent brewery in France. Each year, it produces about 700 million bottles, 90 million cans and 25,000 casks. It brews about thirty beers for about 200 references and employs 160 people. It exports 40% of the production.

== History ==
The brewery was founded in 1866 (160 years ago). In 1950, after several repurchases and fusions, it was named "Brasserie Artésienne". Its production was then 45,000 hectolitres a year.

Until 1985, the brewery was mainly focused on the regional market. That year, it was bought by the Saint-Arnould group and adopted the name Brasserie de Saint-Omer.

The Facon breweries, in Pont-de-Briques and in Semeuse, Lille, merged with Saint-Omer in 1995. The new company resulting from that merger was named GSA Brasseries.

In 1996, the Pecqueur family sold the brewery to Heineken International.

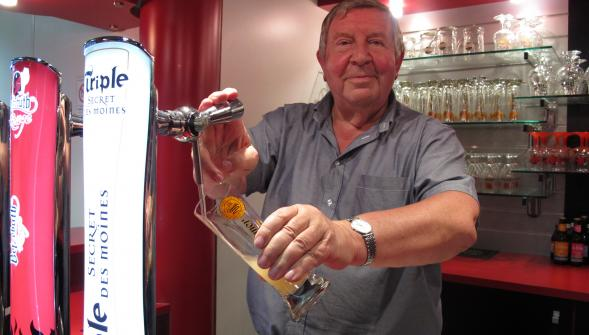
André Pecqueur drawing a glass of Saint-Omer beer

In 2008, Heineken wished to divest itself of the Saint-Omer brewery. André Pecqueur, former CEO of the brewery, acquired it. The Brasserie de Saint-Omer again became an independent brewery and returned to the Pecqueur family's fold.
