= James Mabbe =

English scholar, translator, and poet (1572–1642)

James Mabbe or Mab (1572–1642) was an English scholar, translator, and poet, and a Fellow of Magdalen College, Oxford. He was involved in translations from Spanish, notably of the Picaresque novel by Mateo Alemán, Guzmán de Alfarache, in 1622. He also translated some of the Novelas ejemplares of Miguel de Cervantes and, in 1631, La Celestina, a 300-page play, or "novel in dialogue," by Fernando de Rojas, under the title The Spanish Bawd.

James Mabbe may also be the "I. M." who wrote the fourth commendatory verse to the First Folio of Shakespeare's plays (1623), given that his friend and colleague Leonard Digges wrote the third.
