= Henry Fitzgeffrey =

English barrister & writer (??–1639/40)

- Died: 1639 or 1640
- Occupations: Barrister, Writer

Henry Fitzgeffrey (died 1639 or 1640) was an English barrister and writer of satires and epigrams.

== Life ==
He was the second son of Sir George Fitzgeffrey of Barford, Bedfordshire. A Westminster scholar, he matriculated at Trinity College, Cambridge in 1611. A student at Lincoln's Inn from 1614, he was called to the bar in 1621.

== Works ==
In 1617, appeared Certain Elegies, done by Sundrie excellent Wits. With Satyres and Epigrames, octavo; 2nd edition, 1618; 3rd edition, 1620; 4th edition, undated. The elegies are by F.B. (Francis Beaumont?), N.H. (Nathaniel Hooke?), and M.D. (Michael Drayton?). They are followed by "The Author in Praise of his own Booke", four lines; and "Of his deare Friend the Author H. F.", eight lines, signed "Nath. Gvrlyn", to which is appended "The Author's Answer".

In the first satire. there are some notices of ephemeral tracts. After the second satire is a copy of commendatory verses by John Stephens. Then follows The Second Booke: of Satyrical Epigrams, with a dedication "To his True Friend Tho: Fletcher of Lincoln's Inn, Gentleman;" and at the end of the epigrams is another copy of commendatory verses by Stephens. The Third Booke of Humours: Intituled Notes from Black-Fryers, opens with an epigram "To his Love: Chamber-Fellow and nearest Friend Nat. Gvrlin of Lincolnes-Inn, Gentleman". The notes are followed by some more verses of Stephens, the epilogue "The Author for Himselfe", and finally a verse 'Post-script to his Book-binder'. Twelve copies of the little volume were reprinted, from the edition of 1620, for Edward Vernon Utterson at the Beldornie Press in 1843.
