= Mateo Alemán =

Spanish novelist and writer (1547-1614)

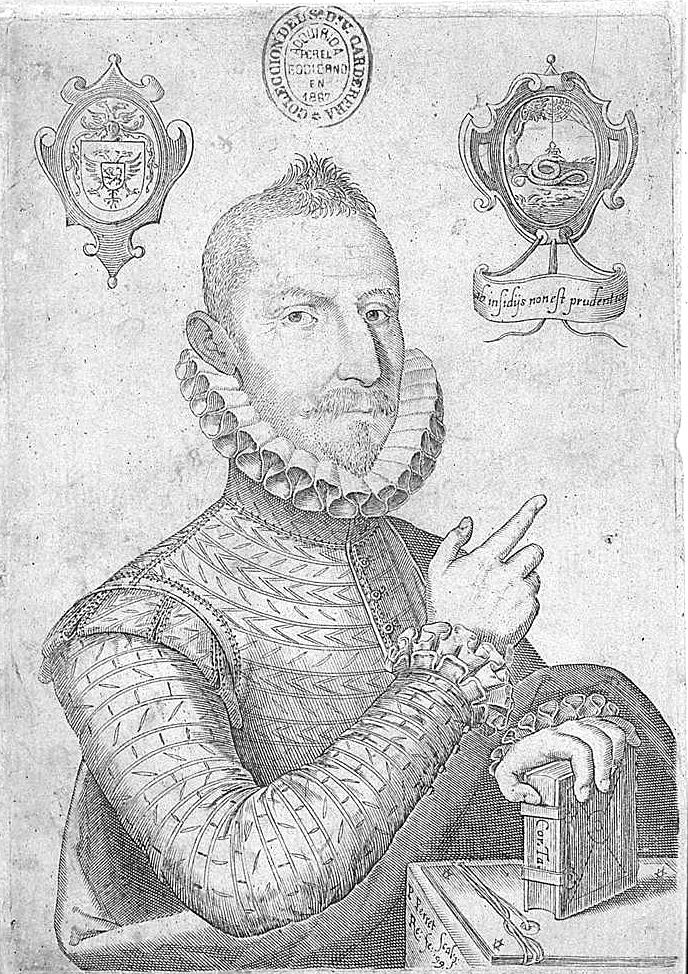
- Born: September 1547; Seville, Andalucía
- Died: 1614; Mexico City
- Education: University of Seville; University of Salamanca; University of Alcalá
- Occupations: writer and printer
- Writing career
- Notable work: Guzmán de Alfarache

Signature
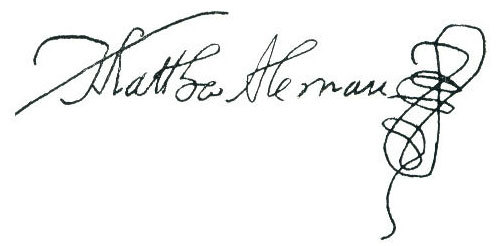

Aleman is sometimes used to refer to German.

Mateo Alemán y del Nero (Seville, September 1547 – Mexico City, 1614) was a Spanish novelist and writer.

== Biography ==
Alemán was born in Seville, Andalucía, where he graduated from the University in 1564. He later studied at Salamanca and Alcalá, and from 1571 to 1588 held a post in the treasury; in 1594 he was arrested on suspicion of malversation, but was speedily released. According to some authors, he was descended from Jews forcibly converted to Catholicism after 1492, and one of his forebears had been burned by the Inquisition for secretly continuing to practice Judaism. In 1599, he published the first part of Guzmán de Alfarache, a celebrated picaresque novel which passed through sixteen editions in five years; a spurious sequel was issued in 1602, but the authentic continuation did not appear until 1604.

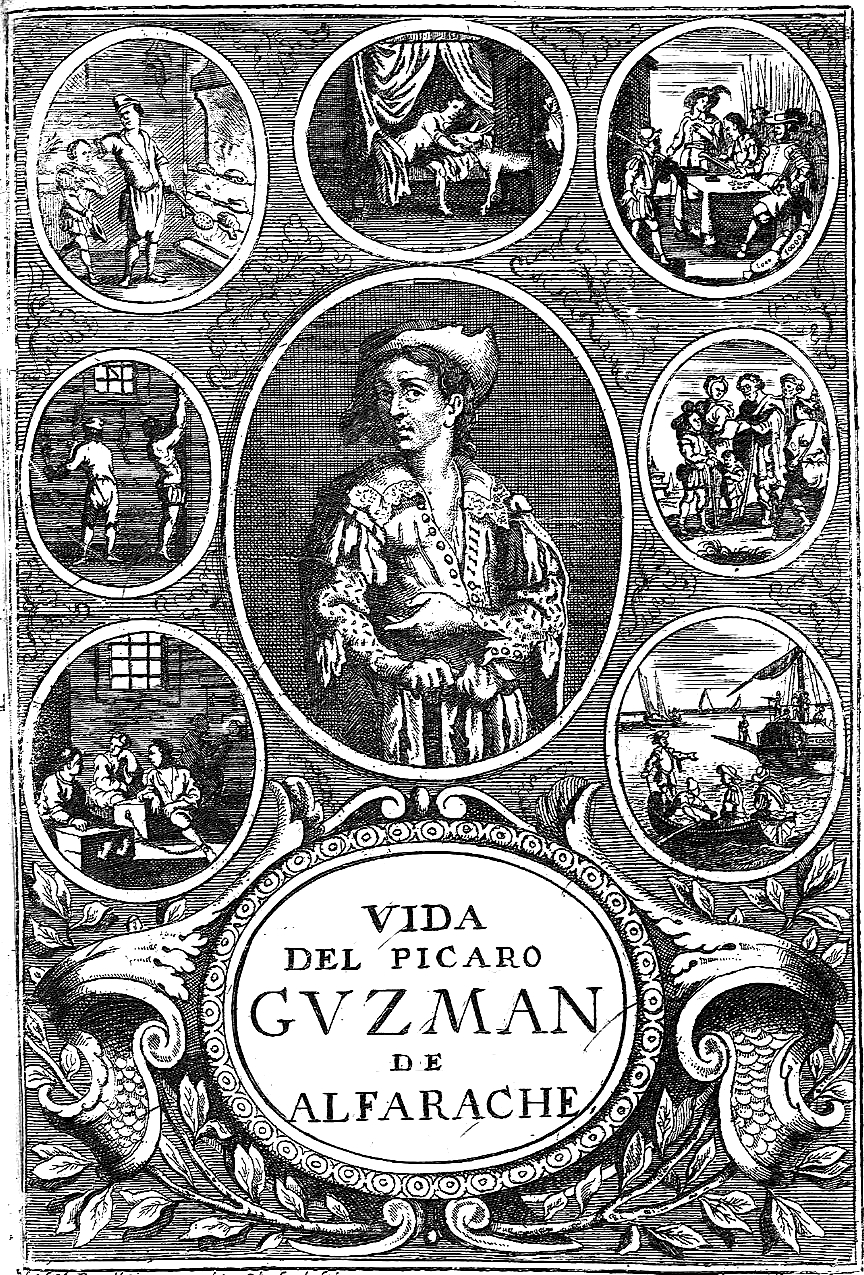
Frontispiece from a 17th-century edition of Guzmán de Alfarache, Antwerp, 1681

In 1571, Alemán married, unhappily, Catalina de Espinosa, and was constantly in money difficulties, being imprisoned for debt at Seville at the end of 1602.

In 1608, Alemán emigrated to America, and is said to have carried on business as a printer in Mexico, where he is assumed to have remained for the rest of his life. His Ortografía castellana (1609), published in Mexico, contains ingenious and practical proposals for the reform of Spanish spelling. Nothing is recorded of Alemán after 1609, but it is sometimes asserted that he was still living in 1617.

== Works ==
In addition to the works already mentioned, Alemán is the author of a life (1604) of St. Anthony of Padua, and versions of two odes of Horace bear witness to his taste and metrical accomplishment. His most famous work, however, is Guzmán de Alfarache, which was translated into French in 1600, into Italian in 1606, into German in 1615, into English in 1622 by James Mabbe, and into Latin in 1623.
