= Edward Scarisbrick =

British Royal Navy admiral

- Born: 1639; Lancashire
- Died: 19 February 1708–9
- Occupation: Jesuit

Edward Scarisbrick, also known as Edward Neville, (1639 – 19 February 1708–9) was an English Jesuit.

== Biography ==
Scarisbrick born in Lancashire in 1639, was son of Edward Scarisbrick, esq., of Scarisbrick Hall in that county, by Frances, daughter of Roger Bradshaigh of Haig Hall. He prosecuted his humanity studies in the English Jesuit College at St. Omer; entered that order 7 September 1660 at Watten, under the assumed name of Neville, and was professed of the four vows 2 February 1676–7. In 1675 he was prefect of St. Omer. Afterwards he was sent to the English mission in the Lancashire district, and his name appears in the list of Titus Oates's intended victims. In 1686 he was in the London district, and was appointed by James II to be one of the royal preachers and chaplains. On the outbreak of the revolution in December 1688 he escaped to the Continent, and he is mentioned in 1689 as living in France with several other English priests. In 1692 he was instructor of the tertian fathers of the Society of Jesus at Ghent, and in 1693 he was again in the Lancashire district, where he died on 19 February 1708–9.

His works are:

- ‘Sermon on Spiritual Leprosy, delivered on the 13th Sunday after Pentecost, 1686, before Queen Catherine,’ London, 1687, 4to; reprinted in ‘A Select Collection of Catholick Sermons,’ London, 1741, ii. 427.
- ‘Sermon on Catholic Loyalty, preached before the King and Queen at Whitehall, the 30th of January 1687,’ London, 1688, 8vo; reprinted in the same collection, i. 223.
- ‘The Life of Lady Warner, of Parham in Suffolk, in Religion called Sister Clare of Jesus; written by a Catholic Gentleman (N. N.),’ London, 1691, 8vo; second edition, ‘to which is added an abridgment of the Life of Mrs. E. Warner, in religion Mary Clare,’ London, 1692, 8vo; third edition, London, 1696, 8vo; fourth edition, London, 1858, 8vo.
- ‘Rules and Instructions for the Sodality of the Immaculate Conception’ (anon.), 1703, 12mo.
