= 1662 in literature =

This article contains information about the literary events and publications of 1662.

== Events ==
- February 15 – The first performance of Sir William Davenant's The Law Against Lovers – the first Restoration adaptation of Shakespeare, consisting of an amalgam of Measure for Measure and Much Ado About Nothing – is given by the Duke's Company at its new theater in Lincoln's Inn Fields, London.
- September 29 – Samuel Pepys in his diary calls the King's Company production of A Midsummer Night's Dream in London "the most insipid, ridiculous play that ever I saw in my life."
- October 18 – John Ogilby, Master of the Revels in Ireland, opens the first Theatre Royal, Dublin, in Smock Alley.
- December 26 – The première of Molière's comedy The School for Wives (L'École des femmes) is held at the Théâtre du Palais-Royal (rue Saint-Honoré) in Paris.
- unknown dates
  - Two autos sacramentales by Pedro Calderón de la Barca – Las órdenes militares and Mística y real Babilonia – are the subject of an inquiry by the Spanish Inquisition. The former is censured and its manuscript copies confiscated, and remains condemned until 1671.
  - The Parliament of England passes the first Printing Act of the Restoration era, the Licensing of the Press Act, which restricts London printing to a total of 24 printing houses, each with no more than three presses and three apprentices. Books printed abroad are banned. Roger L'Estrange is granted a warrant to seize seditious books or pamphlets.

== New books ==
=== Prose ===
- Church of England – 1662 Book of Common Prayer
- Sarah Blackborow – The Oppressed Prisoners' Complaint
- Margaret Cavendish – Orations of Diverse Persons
- Cyrano de Bergerac (posthumous) – États et Empires du Soleil (The States and Empires of the Sun)
- Franciscus van den Enden – Kort Verhael van Nieuw-Nederland (Brief Account of New Netherland)
- John Evelyn – Sculptura: or The history, and art of chalcography and engraving in copper...
- Thomas Fuller – The History of the Worthies of England
- John Heydon
  - The Harmony of the World
  - The English Physician's Guide
- Adam Olearius – The Voyages & Travels of the Ambassadors (translated by John Davies, of Kidwelly)

=== Drama ===
- Margaret Cavendish – Plays Written by the Thrice Noble, Illustrious and Excellent Princess, the Lady Marchioness of Newcastle (closet dramas)
- Aston Cockayne – The Tragedy of Ovid published
- Pierre Corneille – Sertorius
- Sir William Davenant – The Law Against Lovers
- William Heminges – The Jews' Tragedy published
- Robert Howard – The Committee
- Francis Kirkman (probable compiler) – The Wits, or Sport for Sport (collection of drolleries)
- Thomas Middleton and John Webster – Anything for a Quiet Life published
- Molière – The School for Wives
- John Wilson – The Cheats

=== Poetry ===
- Joost van den Vondel – Joannes de Boetgezant
- Michael Wigglesworth – The Day of Doom, or A Poetical Description of the Great and Last Judgement

== Births ==
- January 27 – Richard Bentley, English classicist (died 1742)
- October 18 – Matthew Henry, English Bible commentator (died 1714)
- Baptized December 17 – Samuel Wesley, English poet and author (died 1735)
- unknown date – John Hudson, English classicist and librarian (died 1719)

== Deaths ==
- March 10 – Samuel Hartlib, German-born English polymath (born 1600)
- March 30 – François le Métel de Boisrobert, French poet (born 1592)
- May – Daniel de Priézac, French political writer (born 1590)
- August 17 – Richard Hubberthorne, English Quaker preacher and writer (born 1628)
- August 19 – Blaise Pascal, French philosopher (born 1623)
- unknown date – Henry Jeanes, English controversialist and pamphleteer (born 1611)
