= 1626 in literature =

This article contains information about the literary events and publications of 1626.

== Events ==
- February – The King's Men premiere Ben Jonson's satire on the new newsgathering enterprise The Staple of News, his first new play in almost a decade, at the Blackfriars Theatre in London.
- November – The deaths of Lancelot Andrewes and Nicholas Felton, Bishop of Ely, prompt John Milton, then a student at Cambridge, to write elegies in Latin for both.
- December 27 – Izaak Walton marries Rachel Floud (died 1640).

== New books ==
=== Prose ===
- Francis Bacon – The New Atlantis
- Nicholas Breton – Fantastickes
- Alonso de Castillo Solórzano – Jornadas alegres
- Robert Fludd – Philosophia Sacra
- Marie de Gournay – Les Femmes et Grief des Dames (The Ladies' Grievance)
- Francisco de Quevedo – El Buscón (first published edition – unauthorized)

=== Drama ===
- Pieter Corneliszoon Hooft – Baeto, oft oorsprong der Holanderen
- John Fletcher and collaborators – The Fair Maid of the Inn
- William Heminges – The Jews' Tragedy
- Jean Mairet – La Sylvie
- Philip Massinger – A New Way to Pay Old Debts
- Thomas May – Cleopatra
- Thomas Middleton – The Triumphs of Health and Prosperity
- Tirso de Molina – La Huerta de San Juan
- James Shirley – The Maid's Revenge; The Brothers

== Births ==
- January – Robert Howard, English dramatist and politician (died 1698)
- February 5 – Madame de Sévigné, French letter writer (died 1696)
- March 12 – John Aubrey, English antiquary and writer (died 1697)
- July 25 – Gerard Brandt, Dutch dramatist and historian (died 1685)
- September 8 – Simon Patrick, English theologian and bishop (died 1707)
- October 6 – Géraud de Cordemoy, French historian, philosopher and lawyer (died 1684)
- Unknown dates
  - Elizabeth Egerton, Countess of Bridgewater, English poet and dramatist (died 1663)
  - Alonso de Olmedo y Ormeño, Spanish actor and dramatist (died 1682)

== Deaths ==
- February – William Rowley, English dramatist (born c. 1585)
- February 28 – Cyril Tourneur, English dramatist (born 1575)
- September 25
  - Lancelot Andrewes, English scholar and bishop (born 1555)
  - Théophile de Viau, French poet and dramatist (born 1590)
- October 19 (estimated) – Béroalde de Verville, French poet and novelist (born 1556)
- December 8 – Sir John Davies, English poet (born 1569)
- unknown date – Samuel Purchas, English miscellanist and travel writer (born c. 1577)
- probable – Nicholas Breton, English poet and novelist (born c. 1545)
