= The Devil's Law Case =

1623 tragicomedy play

- Original title: The deuils law-case. Or, When women goe to law, the Deuill is full of businesse
- Original language: Early Modern English
- Written by: John Webster
- Characters: Contarino; Leonora; Jolenta; Ercole; Winifrid; Romelio; Capuchin; Crispiano; Angiolella; Monticelso; Contilupo
- Genre: English Renaissance theatre Tragicomedy
- Setting: Naples

Premiere
- Date: c. 1617–19
- Place: Cockpit Theatre, London

The Devil's Law Case is a Jacobean era stage play, a tragicomedy written by John Webster, and first published in 1623.

== Date ==
The play's date of authorship and early performance history is unknown. The events upon which the play is based occurred in 1610, so that the drama must post-date that year. Some critics have seen signs of influence from Ben Jonson's The Devil Is an Ass in Webster's play, and so have dated it soon after the autumn 1616 premier of Jonson's play; but other scholars have favoured a date after 1620, based on contemporary allusions in the text.

According to one theory, Webster wrote his play for Queen Anne's Men, and specifically with the view that their lead actor Richard Perkins would play the protagonist Romelio. The play was designed to open the Phoenix Theatre – the renamed Cockpit Theatre after it was rebuilt following damage in the Shrovetide apprentices' riot in the spring of 1617.

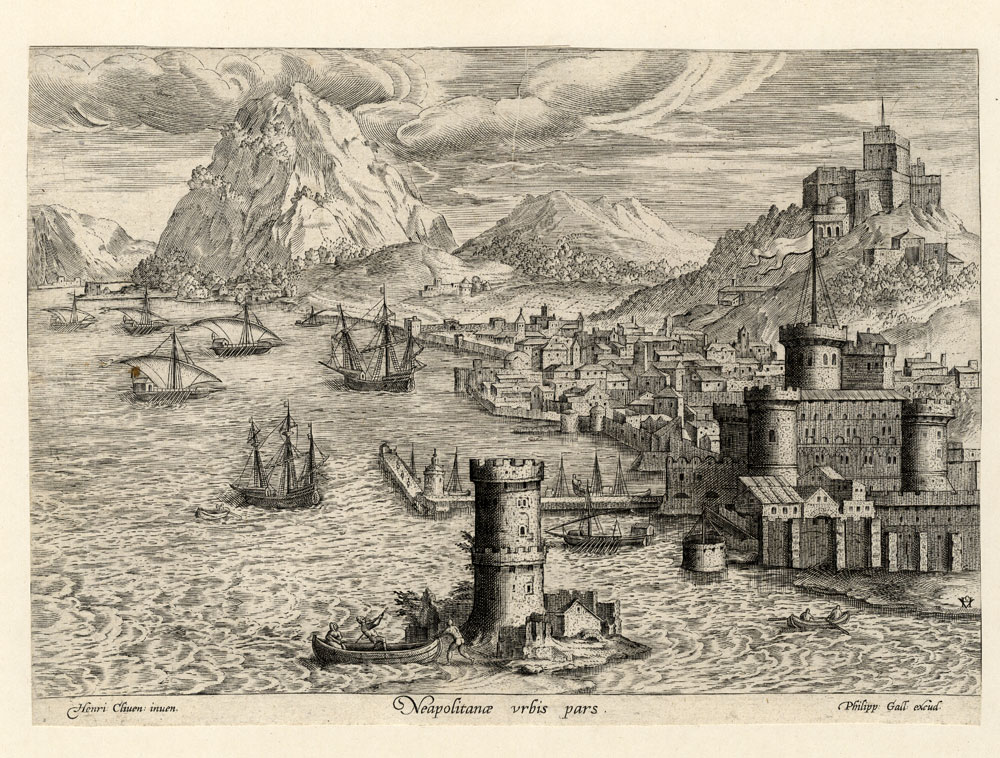
The play is set in Naples (1575 engraving)

== Publication ==
The play was printed in quarto in 1623 printed by Augustine Matthews for the bookseller John Grismand. This first edition gives the play the subtitle When Women Go to Law, the Devil is Full of Business. Webster dedicated the play to Sir Thomas Finch, Baronet. The wording of the dedication – "let it not appear strange, that I do aspire to your patronage" – indicates that Webster was seeking Finch's support rather than responding to support already received. Webster made a similar appeal for support in his dedication of The Duchess of Malfi to George Harding, 8th Baron Berkeley. It is unknown if either of these appeals produced any positive result.

== Influences ==
The Devil's Law Case partakes of a set of relationships with other plays of its era, centring on a plot twist involving a child's legitimacy and a mother's fidelity; some of the plays involved can be dated with some accuracy, while others cannot. The Fletcher/Massinger collaboration The Spanish Curate dates from 1622; The Fair Maid of the Inn, in which Webster collaborated with Fletcher, Massinger, and John Ford, dates from the mid-1620s, after the publication of The Devil's Law Case. The closest connection is between The Devil's Law Case and Lust's Dominion, though the manifold uncertainties of the latter play's date and authorship can provide no certain information about Webster's work.

== Critical responses ==
In The Devil's Law Case, as in his Appius and Virginia, "Webster reverses his anarchistic position" as displayed in The White Devil and The Duchess of Malfi, "and asserts the priority of social order." "As Webster becomes more pessimistic about nature, he turns to law to replace it, or at least to control it." The subject of the law is very prominent in Webster's play, and has drawn the attention of a range of commentators.

James Russell Lowell called The Devil's Law Case Webster's "best play." No other commentator has reached the same height of enthusiasm. Critics have complained of the play's looseness in plotting and structure.

== Synopsis ==
Romelio is a prominent merchant of Naples. He is fortunate, never having lost a vessel to shipwreck. He is rich; he mocks another merchant who has reached the age of 60 and amassed a fortune of only 50 thousand ducats. And he is arrogant: another character condemns his "insolent vainglory." Romelio directs some of his arrogance toward Contarino, the young nobleman, indebted to the merchant, who hopes to marry Romelio's sister Jolenta. For Romelio, Contarino is just another wastrel aristocrat who hopes to repair his decayed fortunes by marrying into the wealthy merchant class. Romelio instead is trying to arrange a marriage between Jolenta and Ercole, a Spanish noble who commands a fleet against the Ottoman Turks (Spain ruled Naples and southern Italy during the Renaissance).

Jolenta, however, loves Contarino, and resists having her fate bartered away. Contarino tries to advance his cause by appealing to Leonora, the mother of Romelio and Jolenta, flattering her by requesting her portrait. Leonora remains a supporter of Ercole's suit – but she becomes interested in Contarino herself. When Jolenta remains resistant, Romelio sets the servant Winifred to watch over her and keep her from contacting Contarino. Winifred, however, is sympathetic to the girl, and does just the opposite; in conversation with his intended bride, Contarino learns of Ercole's pursuit of her.

The play's subplot introduces Crispiano, a Spanish judge who has assumed a disguise to spy upon his scapegrace son Julio (a plot device that occurs in a number of English Renaissance plays). Julio is overspending his allowance on riotous living, wasting "A hundred ducats a month in breaking Venice glasses." Julio is a friend of Romelio, which blends the two plots. Ariosto, a stern local lawyer, accuses Romelio of exploiting foolish young men like Julio by encouraging them to go into debt and mortgage their inheritances.

Contarino confronts Ercole about Jolenta. In their duel, both are seriously and almost fatally wounded, before they are discovered and brought to medical attention. Romelio is informed that the law of averages has caught up with his trading ventures, and that three of his carracks have been lost at sea. Ariosto, who brings the news, tries to counsel patience and fortitude to Romelio, but the arrogant merchant has no time for him. A false report reaches Romelio and Leonora that both Ercole and Contarino are dead; Leonora is devastated by the news of Contarino's loss. Contarino's last will and testament, delivered to Romelio, names Jolenta as his heir. Both learn, however, that each of the duellists is still alive; Leonora rejoices.

Because of the will, Romelio has another reason to wish Contarino dead. Masquerading as a Jew, Romelio goes to see Contarino, and talks his way past the two surgeons who treat the wounded man; but they are suspicious, and surreptitiously keep watch. Romelio stabs Contarino along the track of his existing wound; the two surgeons catch him in the act, forcing Romelio to reveal himself and buy their silence. The surgeons had despaired of their patient's recovery – but Romelio's intervention has allowed the "congeal'd blood" and "putrefaction" to flow from the infected wound, and Contarino begins to recover.

Romelio thinks he has killed the man, however, and tells his sister so. He has a plot that needs Jolenta's co-operation. She is Contarino's heiress via his will; Romelio can make Jolenta Ercole's heiress too, if he can claim that she bears his child. The child would be legitimate under their precontract of marriage. Romelio has seduced and impregnated a "beauteuous nun," a member of the Order of Saint Clare; Romelio wants to pass off his coming bastard as Jolenta's. Jolenta, testing how far her brother will go, tells him that she is pregnant with Contarino's child; Romelio accepts this, and suggests that when the time comes they can claim she's had twins. Jolenta informs her brother that she is not really pregnant; she vents her Websterian contempt of him and all mankind. Romelio is unfazed; he plots ahead to pack her off to a nunnery after the baby's birth, and to send the two surgeons to the Indies to keep them from blackmailing him.

In a long soliloquy, Leonora expresses her disgust at her son, and reveals her scheme to punish and ruin him. With the loss of his ships, Romelio is now dependent upon his family estates for income; Leonora challenges his right to them, by claiming in a court of law that he is a bastard and not her husband's son (the law case of the title, based on an actual case that occurred in Spain in 1610). In front of the judge Crispiano, she claims that she had an affair with a family friend while her husband was away. Winifred supports her mistress's story – which has a fatal flaw: the family friend who is the alleged father of the bastard Romelio is Crispiano. The judge steps down from the bench, hands the case over to Ariosto, and reveals his disguise. Her falsehood exposed, Leonora expresses the intention of retiring to the religious life.

Both Ercole and Contarino, recovered from their wounds, are present in the courtroom in disguise. Ercole reveals himself, and is arrested for killing Contarino; but he challenges Romelio, and a trial by combat is arranged. Julio is Romelio's second, while Ercole is seconded by the still-disguised Contarino. (This part of the plot makes little sense, the biggest of the plotting and structure problems condemned by critics. Contarino senselessly neglects the obvious recourse of showing everyone that he's not dead.) A Capuchin friar comes to see and counsel Romelio, who grows tired of his preachiness and locks him away – preventing the friar from revealing that Contarino is still alive.

The duel is held, and the fight goes on for a time without conclusion. Romelio, under a sudden attack of conscience, orders the friar released so that the man can pray for him. The friar arrives in time to reveal Contarino's survival, negating the grounds of the duel. Jolenta, the pregnant nun Angiolella, and the two surgeons arrive; Jolenta is made up like a Moor and one of the surgeons is in Romelio's Jewish disguise, for no good reason. All the skeins of the plot are exposed, and Judge Ariosto resolves them with a set of rulings. Romelio must restore Contarino's fortune, and marry the pregnant nun Angiolella; she, Leonora, and Jolenta must build a monastery to express their penitence. Julio goes off to fight the Turks. The perfunctory conclusion neglects the most obvious feature of the happy ending appropriate to tragicomedy, Jolenta's marriage.

The Devil's Law Case is unusual in that it has no specific clown figure; its comic relief is supplied by various minor characters. The play delivers doses of Websterian bitterness, against men, women, lawyers, and doctors.

== Sources ==
- Boyd, Brian, ed. Words That Count: Essays on Early Modern Authorship in Honor of MacDonald P. Jackson. Newark, DE, University of Delaware Press, 2004.
- Brooke, Rupert. John Webster and the Elizabethan Drama. London, John Lane, 1916.
- Goldberg, Dena. Between Worlds: A Study of the Plays of John Webster. Waterloo, ON, Wilfrid Laurier University Press, 1987.
- Habermann, Ina. Staging Slander and Gender in Early Modern England. London, Ashgate, 2003.
- Logan, Terence P., and Denzell S. Smith, eds. The Later Jacobean and Caroline Dramatists: A Survey and Bibliography of Recent Studies in English Renaissance Drama. Lincoln, NE, University of Nebraska Press, 1978.
- Pearson, Jacqueline. Tragedy and Tragicomedy in the Plays of John Webster. Manchester, Manchester University Press, 1980.
