= Fair Maid =

Fair Maid may refer to:

- Eleanor, Fair Maid of Brittany (1184–1241)
- Margaret, Maid of Norway (1283–1290), the Fair Maid of Norway
- Joan of Kent (1328–1385), the Fair Maid of Kent
- Margaret Douglas, Fair Maid of Galloway (died 1474)
- The Fair Maid of the Inn, a comedy in the canon of John Fletcher
- The Fair Maid of Perth, a novel by Sir Walter Scott
- The Fair Maid of the West, a play written by Thomas Heywood
