= William Heminges =

17th-century British playwright

William Heminges (1602 – c. 1653?), also Hemminges, Heminge, and other variants, was an English playwright and theatrical figure of the Caroline period. He was the ninth child and third son of John Heminges, the actor and colleague of William Shakespeare, and his wife Rebecca.

William Heminges was christened on 3 October 1602 in the parish of St. Mary's, Aldermanbury, in London. He was educated at Winchester School and then at Christ Church, Oxford, where he attained his M.A. degree in 1628. Only two of his plays have survived, The Jews' Tragedy (1626; published 1662) and The Fatal Contract (c. 1639; published 1653). In these two tragedies, the dramatist was strongly influenced by the works of Shakespeare. A third play is lost: titled The Coursing of the Hare, or the Madcap, it was staged at the Fortune Theatre in March 1633.

Little is known of Heminges's life. The parish records of St. Giles in the Fields record the birth of a daughter in 1639, and the burials of two sons a decade later. He was in financial difficulties in the middle 1630s, and spent some time in prison. His date of death is a mystery; Andrew Pennycuicke and Anthony Turner, the booksellers who issued The Fatal Contract in 1653, refer to him then as deceased.

== The "Elegy" ==
Among Heminges's non-dramatic literary works, his satirical "Elegy on Randolph's Finger" (c. 1632) has gathered significant attention from scholars and critics. Its fullest version occurs in MS. Ashmole 38 in the collection of the Bodleian Library at Oxford. The poem refers to an incident in which Thomas Randolph lost his finger "in a fray" with "a riotous gentleman." (Heminges and Randolph were friends and former schoolmates.) In the poem, the severed finger is carried into the Underworld by group of English poets that includes Shakespeare, Ben Jonson, Michael Drayton, Thomas Dekker, Thomas Middleton, George Chapman, Thomas Heywood, James Shirley, John Ford, John Webster, and Richard Brome, among others – the "neoterical refined wits" of the age.

Charon, however, refuses to ferry the group across the river Styx, because they can't pay his fee. (John Taylor the Water Poet tries to talk Charon into giving them a free ride...but unsuccessfully.) Eventually the poets obtain some of Mercury's quicksilver, and use that to pay the fare. Across the river, Randolph's finger is welcomed by Edmund Spenser, Geoffrey Chaucer, Rabelais, Plautus, Terence, and other worthies.

An excerpt from the longer poem, in slightly different form, is known by the title "On the Time Poets." It was first published anonymously in the 1656 collection Choice Drollery, Songs, and Sonnets.

As John Heminges' last surviving son, William Heminges inherited his father's shares in the Globe Theatre and the Blackfriars Theatre at John Heminges's death in 1630. Together with Cuthbert Burbage, Richard Robinson and Winifred (d.1642), his wife, Joseph Taylor and John Lowin, William Heminges filed a Bill of Complaint on 28 January 1632 in the Court of Requests against the owner of the Globe, Sir Matthew Brend, in order to obtain confirmation of an extension of the 31-year lease originally granted by Sir Matthew Brend's father, Nicholas Brend.

Heminges sold off his shares from 1630 to 1634, primarily to John Shank, comedian with the King's Men. William's sales to Shank earned him £156 in 1633 and £350 in 1634. William "was then in difficulties, and Shank disbursed additional small sums to him in prison." Shank's sudden wealth in theatre shares (two shares in the Blackfriars and three in the Globe) provoked three other members of the King's Men, Robert Benfield, Thomas Pollard, and Eliard Swanston, to petition the Lord Chamberlain for a more equitable division of the wealth. The resulting controversy generated what are often termed the "Sharers's papers," documents that provide significant information of the theatrical conditions of the time.
