= Alex Gough =

Alex Gough may refer to:

- Alex Gough (luger) (born 1987), female Canadian Olympic luger
- Alex Gough (squash player) (born 1970), male professional squash player
- Alexander Gough (1614–?), English actor
- Alexander Dick Gough (1804–1871), English architect
