= The Jews' Tragedy =

Play by William Heminges

The Jews' Tragedy is an early Caroline era stage play by William Heminges. Written in 1626 but apparently never acted in its own era, the drama was the most intensive and detailed attempt to portray Jews onstage in English Renaissance theatre.

Earlier plays — The Three Ladies of London, The Jew of Malta, The Merchant of Venice and others — had depicted Jews with varying degrees of antipathy or sympathy, though they featured a single Jewish character, or a few at most. No dramatist before Heminges attempted to present a full cast of Jewish characters or to depict Jewish society. The prevailing anti-Semitism in England at the time makes it unsurprising that the work was not staged — and somewhat surprising that it was ever written.

Though never produced before an audience, Heminges's drama was published in 1662, under the title The Jewes Tragedy, or their fatal and final overthrow by Vespasian and Titus his son, agreeable to the authentick and famous History of Josephus.

Like Heminges's other surviving play The Fatal Contract, The Jews' Tragedy was heavily influenced by the works of Shakespeare. The Jews' Tragedy is the earliest play to quote Hamlet's famous soliloquy, "To be or not to be."

(During the Restoration, John Crowne wrote a two-part drama on the same subject, titled The Destruction of Jerusalem, acted in 1677. Crowne's play satirized the Puritans as Pharisees; it was a popular success.)

The Jews' Tragedy was given a reading, a "performance with scripts," at Shakespeare's Globe Theatre in 1998, directed by Graham Watts.
