= Georgia Shakespeare =

20th/21st-century American theatre company

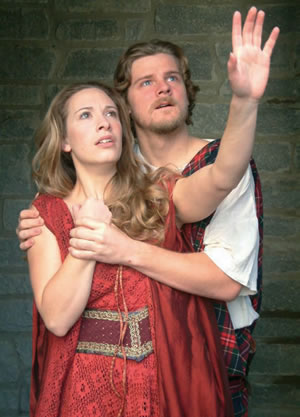
Joanna Mitchell and Jason Loughlin in Georgia Shakespeare's 2007 production of Macbeth

Georgia Shakespeare (formerly Georgia Shakespeare Festival) was a professional, not-for-profit theatre company located in Atlanta, Georgia, in the United States on the campus of Oglethorpe University from 1985-2014. Georgia Shakespeare produced three plays annually, primarily between June and November. Twelve educational programs were developed in the history of Georgia Shakespeare. These programs included "The High School Tour", a "High School Acting Competition", "Camp Shakespeare", a "High School Conservatory", a "No Fear Shakespeare" training program for educators, after school residencies, school tours, student matinees, classes for professionals, and in-school workshops. At its peak, it welcomed 60,000 patrons annually to its performances.

== History ==
=== 1985–1989 ===
Georgia Shakespeare was founded in 1985 by Lane Anderson, Richard Garner, and Robert Watson under the name Georgia Shakespeare Festival. The company produced two plays each year, with its first offering being productions of The Taming of the Shrew and King Lear in rotating repertory starting July 10, 1986. The rising theatre company went through several locations in its first years. Its first season was on the Oglethorpe University front athletic field in a rectangular, white 60' X 90' tent with a seating capacity of 300. The theatre changed tents for its second season and was housed in a circular tent with a 90' diameter. This new tent increased the seating capacity by 50. For the theatre's fifth season, it moved into a 110' diameter circular tent that seated 400.

=== 1990–1999 ===
In 1991, Georgia Shakespeare expanded to three plays annually, and performed an adaptation of The Three Musketeers as its first work not written by William Shakespeare. In later years, the company has performed between three and seven plays per season. Georgia Shakespeare opened its 1997 season in the $5.7 million John A. and Miriam H. Conant Performing Arts Center with The Tempest. The Conant Center has a 509-seat modified thrust stage and it was this move that allowed the addition of a fall performance to the season schedule.

=== 2000–2009 ===
In 2001, Georgia Shakespeare became a member of the League of Resident Theaters and Shakespeare Theatre Association of America. At the time, it was one of only two theatres in the state of Georgia to be a part of this league. In 2004, Professor Andrew James Hartley, Distinguished Professor of Shakespeare Studies at the University of North Carolina at Charlotte, was appointed the company's first resident dramaturg (having served a similar long0time role in a production-to-production basis). In 2005, he published a book, The Shakespearean Dramaturg: A Theoretical and Practical Guide, based on his eight years experience dramaturging in the American southeast.

=== 2010–2014 ===
In 2011, mired in debt, the theatre launched a 'Save Georgia Shakespeare' campaign which was successful in raising over $500,000. When Georgia Shakespeare was still performing under a tent, patrons of the theatre started bringing pre-show picnics. This became a tradition and when the Conant Performing Arts Center was built, a covered area with tables and chairs was set aside for picnics. In 2014, the grounds underwent a renovation funded through several Atlanta-area private foundations. In 2014, the theatre company closed for good in the middle of its 29th season, unable to stay open due to its high debts.

== Productions ==
1986

- The Taming of the Shrew
- King Lear

1987

- Much Ado About Nothing
- Romeo & Juliet

1988

- A Midsummer Night's Dream
- The Winter's Tale

1989

- Twelfth Night
- The Comedy of Errors

1990

- Macbeth
- As You Like It

1991

- The Three Musketeers
- Richard III
- Two Gentlemen of Verona

1992

- Love's Labour's Lost
- The Tempest
- Hamlet: Godfather Of Brooklyn

1993

- Cyrano de Bergerac
- SHREW: The Musical
- Henry V

1994

- A Midsummer Night's Dream
- The Merchant of Venice
- The Imaginary Invalid

1995

- Much Ado About Nothing
- The Country Wife
- Booth, Brother Booth
- King Lear

1996

- Twelfth Night: A New Musical
- The Bourgeois Gentleman
- Troilus and Cressida
- Booth, Brother Booth

1997

- The Tempest
- The School for Scandal
- Othello

1998

- Henry IV, Part I
- The Miser
- Measure for Measure
- Macbeth

1999

- Hamlet
- The Comedy of Errors
- St. Joan
- Romeo & Juliet
- SHREW: The Holiday Musical

2000

- Twelfth Night
- Tartuffe
- Richard II
- A Midsummer Night's Dream
- Readings: Epicoene (Ben Jonson), The Changeling (Thomas Middleton/William Rowley), The History of King Lear (Nathum Tate)

2001

- Amadeus
- As You Like It
- The Winter's Tale
- Julius Caesar
- Readings: The Inland Sea (Naomi Wallace), Thyestes (Seneca), Mandragola (Machiavelli), A Mad World My Masters (Thomas Middleton), The Revenger's Tragedy (Thomas Middleton), The Widow (Thomas Middleton)

2002

- The Two Gentlemen of Verona
- Death of a Salesman
- The Merry Wives of Windsor
- The Taming of the Shrew
- The Gospel of John
- Booth, Brother Booth
- Readings: The Tamer Tamed (Fletcher)

2003

- Much Ado About Nothing
- The School for Wives
- The Tale of Cymbeline
- The Tempest

2004

- Shake at the Lake: A Midsummer Night's Dream
- Cyrano de Bergerac
- What the Butler Saw
- Coriolanus
- Macbeth

2005

- Shake at the Lake: Macbeth
- The Comedy of Errors
- A Streetcar Named Desire
- The Cherry Orchard
- The Gospel of John
- Romeo & Juliet

2006

- Shake at the Lake: The Comedy of Errors
- Hamlet
- Twelfth Night
- Treasure Island
- Metamorphoses
- Othello

2007

- Shake at the Lake: Twelfth Night
- Metamorphoses
- The Servant of Two Masters
- Pericles
- Robin Hood
- Loot
- Richard III

2008

- Shake at the Lake: The Servant of Two Masters
- As You Like It
- The Merchant of Venice
- All's Well That Ends Well
- Tom Thumb the Great
- Antigone

2009

- A Midsummer Night's Dream
- Cat on a Hot Tin Roof
- Titus Andronicus
- Alice in Wonderland
- Julius Caesar

2010

- Shake at the Lake: A Midsummer Night's Dream
- Shrew: The Musical
- Love's Labour's Lost
- King Lear
- The Legend of the Sword in the Stone
- The Odyssey: a Journey Home
- A Christmas Story
- The Gospel of John
- Prophets

2011

- The Tempest
- Antony & Cleopatra
- Noises Off
- The Jungle Book
- The Glass Menagerie
- Paul Robeson

2012

- Shakespeare in the Park: The Tempest
- Ilyria: A Twelfth Night Musical
- Much Ado About Nothing
- The Importance of Being Earnest
- The Emperor and the Nightingale
- Macbeth

2013

- Shakespeare in the Park: Much Ado About Nothing
- Metamorphoses
- Mighty Myths & Legends
- Hamlet

2014 (Final Season)

- Shakespeare in the Park: As You Like It
- One Man, Two Guvnors
- The Frog Prince
