= The Sun's Darling =

Play written by Thomas Dekker and John Ford

The Sun's Darling is a masque, or masque-like play, written by John Ford and Thomas Dekker, and first published in 1656.

The Sun's Darling was licensed for performance by Sir Henry Herbert, the Master of the Revels, on 3 March 1624. It was probably composed not long before; nineteenth-century speculations that the text was an old play of Dekker's, revised by Ford, have fallen out of favor. The original text may have been revised c. 1638–39; material in the early portion of Act V reflects the dominant political situation at that time. Cyrus Hoy has suggested that the play was revised and revived at that time, as a response to Thomas Nabbes's Microcosmus (1636; published 1637). Several attempts have been made by individual commentators to identify the shares of the two collaborators, though no general agreement on the question has been reached.

The first edition was a quarto printed by T. Bell for the bookseller Andrew Pennycuicke. The 1656 title page states that the play was "often presented" by Queen Henrietta's Men at the Cockpit Theatre; but it also makes the questionable claim that the play was "often presented" at Whitehall Palace — a claim dropped from the title page of the second quarto of 1657. If the work had a Court performance, it would in all likelihood have been once or at most twice, not "often."

Pennycuicke dedicated Q1 to Lady Newton, wife of Sir Henry Newton. Q2 was dedicated to Thomas Wriothesley, 4th Earl of Southampton; that dedication is signed by Pennycuicke and the actor Theophilus Bird. Both the 1656 and 1657 editions include prefatory verses by John Tatham. The title pages describe the work as a "moral masque" — an accurate description, in that the drama combines the traits and characteristics of the traditional morality play with those of the 17th-century masque.

Featuring standard masque-style personifications, like Youth, Health, Delight, Time, Detraction, Fortune, etc., and rich in songs, dances, and May-Day games, the play has some obvious crowd appeal to explain its popularity in its own era. The protagonist is Raybright, who is the child and "darling" of the Sun. To treat his melancholy, he is given a year to experience the earthly pleasures of the four seasons. He falls, however, under the deceptive influences of Humor (in the Elizabethan sense) and Folly, and his search for satisfaction is unfulfilled. In the end the Sun warns Raybright that he must resist Folly and Humor to attain harmony.

Some critics have praised the "vitality and beauty" of some of the lyrics in the play; others have judged the work more harshly.
