= The Law Against Lovers =

17th century stage play

The Law Against Lovers was a dramatic adaptation of Shakespeare, arranged by Sir William Davenant and staged by the Duke's Company in 1662. It was the first of the many Shakespearean adaptations staged during the Restoration era.

Davenant was not shy about changing the Bard's work; he based his text on Measure for Measure, but also added Beatrice and Benedick from Much Ado About Nothing — "resulting in a bizarre and fascinating combination." He made Angelo from the former play, and Benedick from the latter, into brothers. The comedy of Pompey the clown and Elbow the constable is excised. Angelo's attempt to seduce the virtuous Isabella becomes a mere test of her commitment to chastity and virtue. Beatrice has a little sister named Viola, who sings and dances.

Samuel Pepys saw The Law Against Lovers at the theatre at Lincoln's Inn Fields on February 18, 1662, and was pleased by it; as he recorded in his Diary,

"I went to the Opera, and saw 'the Law against Lovers', a good play and well performed, especially the little girl's, whom I never saw act before, dancing and singing...."

Female performers were still a recent innovation at that time, having first appeared on the English stage only in December 1660. The "little girl" was the popular Moll Davis, then about fourteen years old; she danced a sarabande while playing castanets.

Davenant was able to represent The Law Against Lovers as his own work; he apparently had jumbled up Shakespeare so successfully that his audience did not recognise what they were seeing and hearing. Both Pepys and John Evelyn were in the house on the same night, and both recorded their impressions of the show, but neither mentions Shakespeare in his remarks. And neither did other viewers. Davenant's adaptation was published in 1673.

Davenant's version was not the last word on adapting Measure for Measure. In 1699, Charles Gildon produced a re-adaptation of Davenant's adaptation: Measure for Measure, or Beauty the Best Advocate. (Davenant took from Shakespeare without acknowledgement; Gildon did the same to Davenant.) Rather than conceal the Shakespearean source, Gildon advertised it, going so far as to have the ghost of Shakespeare speak the play's epilogue. Gildon simplified the whole (Beatrice and Benedick were omitted), but added a masque about Dido and Aeneas and the music of the lately-deceased Henry Purcell. Gildon's version was also staged at Lincoln's Inn Fields; Thomas Betterton played Angelo, and Anne Bracegirdle was Isabella.

Neither Davenant's nor Gildon's adaptation was a great success with its audience, and neither was revived after its initial production.
