= Andrew Pennycuicke =

17th-century English actor and stationer

Andrew Pennycuicke (fl. 1638 – 1658) was a mid-seventeenth-century actor and publisher; he was responsible for publishing a number of plays of English Renaissance drama.

What little is known of Pennycuicke's acting career comes from his own publications. In his edition of Robert Davenport's King John and Matilda, he states that he was the last actor to play the heroine's part in that play, prior to the closing of the theatres in 1642 at the start of the English Civil War. In his edition of Philip Massinger's The City Madam, he states that he acted in that play as well. So Pennycuicke must have been an actor c. 1638–42, up to the closing of the theatres; he was apparently a boy player who took women's roles, and a hired man rather than a sharer in any company. (Queen Henrietta's Men staged a late revival of the Davenport play, in 1638–39, while the Massinger work belonged to the King's Men. Pennycuicke could have worked for both companies at different times.)

With the closure of the theatres (which Pennycuicke himself termed "the absurdity of times"), many actors had to find other means of earning a living. Pennycuicke made the switch from actor to stationer, selling and publishing books. (Other ex-actors, Alexander Gough and William Cartwright, made the same career shift in the same era.) Pennycuicke's earliest known product was Robert Chamberlain's Nocturnal Lucubrations (1652). Given his prior career, it is not surprising that Pennycuicke concentrated on publishing plays, including:

- The Fatal Contract by William Heminges, published 1653
- King John and Matilda by Robert Davenport, 1655
- The Sun's Darling, by Thomas Dekker and John Ford, 1656
- The City Madam by Philip Massinger, 1658.

Pennycuicke resided in the London parish of St. Giles in the Fields, the home of the Cockpit Theatre and of many actors and theatre men of the era, including William Beeston and fellow King's Man Theophilus Bird. Parish records show that Pennycuicke married Dorothy Kinde on 19 October 1647; their infant child was buried there on 4 December 1652.
