= Fantastickes =

Book written by Nicholas Breton

Fantastickes is a 1626 book by the English Renaissance writer Nicholas Breton. It is arranged in the style of The Kalender of Shepherdes; it contains customs, techniques, and natural history writings. It was written by Breton for the "perpetuall prognostication" of posterity. Alexander Balloch Grosart, who compiled and edited Breton's complete works, wrote of it: "Carry it to the greenwood with you, Reader, and if thou art not charmed, I dub thee—soulless.” The book's subtitle was in fact: "Serving for A Perpetuall Prognostication". The Paris Review detailed Breton's whimsical designations of the twelve months within the book.
