= The Queen (play) =

Caroline era tragicomedy

The Queen, or The Excellency of Her Sex is a Caroline-era tragicomedy. Though published anonymously in 1653, The play is now generally attributed to John Ford – making it a significant addition to the very limited canon of Ford's works.

The date and circumstances of the play's authorship and performance are unknown, though scholars can draw some inferences from the little factual information available. The first quarto edition of 1653 was published by the actor-turned-bookseller Alexander Gough. Gough had earlier been a member of the King's Men, and had been part of the cast of that company's production of Ford's The Lover's Melancholy in late 1628 or 1629. This suggests that The Queen may also have been acted by the King's Men. Since Ford is thought to have written for the King's Men only early in his career – just two of his earlier plays were acted by the company – The Queen may be another early work.

The play's internal evidence of style and textual preferences points to Ford; it shows, among other particulars, the pattern of unusual contractions (t'ee for "to ye," d'ee for "do ye," y'are for "you are") that typifies Ford's work. Furthermore, "the work's incidence of rhymes and double and triple endings relative to that of Ford's other plays" also favours an early date in Ford's career, which makes sense in terms of the King's Men connection. The assignment of the play to Ford, first made by the German scholar Willy Bang in 1906, is widely accepted.

The quarto features Gough's dedication of the play to Catherine Mohun, the wife of Lord Warwick Mohun, Baron of Okehampton; and three sets of prefatory verses.

== Synopsis ==
Like The Lover's Melancholy, The Queen shows a strong influence from Robert Burton's The Anatomy of Melancholy. Alphonso, the play's protagonist, is a defeated rebel against Aragon; he has been condemned to death and is about to be executed. The Queen of Aragon (otherwise unnamed) intercedes at the last moment, and learns that Alphonso's rebellion is rooted in his pathological misogyny; the prospect of being ruled by a woman was too much for him to bear. The Queen is struck with love at first sight; she is, in her way, just as irrational as Alphonso is in his. The Queen pardons Alphonso and marries him. Alphonso requests a seven-day separation, to enable him to set aside his feelings against women; and the Queen grants his request. The week extends to a month, and the new king still avoids his queen; the intercession of her counsellors, and even her own personal appeal, make no difference. In a bitter confrontation, Alphonso tells the Queen, "I hate thy sex; of all thy sex, thee worst."

One man, however, sees a solution to the problem. The psychologically sophisticated Muretto half-counsels, half-manipulates Alphonso into a more positive disposition toward the Queen. Muretto praises the Queen's beauty to Alphonso, and simultaneously arouses his jealousy by suggesting that she is sexually active outside her marriage. Muretto functions rather like a modern therapist to treat Alphonso's psychological imbalance. The psychological manipulation works, in the sense that Alphonso begins to value the Queen only after he thinks he has lost her to another man.

Yet with two such passionate individuals, the reconciliation cannot come easily. Alphonso condemns the Queen to death; she can be reprieved only if a champion comes forth to defend her honour by meeting the king in single combat. The Queen, however, is determined to bow to her husband's will no matter the price, and demands that all her followers swear they will not step forward in her cause.

The play's secondary plot deals with the love affair of the Queen's general Velasco, the valiant soldier who defeated Alphonso, and the widow Salassa. Velasco has the opposite problem from Alphonso: he idealises his love for Salassa, terming her "the deity I adore;" he allows her to dominate their relationship. (Velasco's friend and admirer Lodovico has a low opinion of Salassa, calling her a "frail commodity," a "paraquetto," a "wagtail.") Salassa indulges in her power over Velasco by asking him to give up all combat and conflict, or even wearing a sword and defending his reputation, for a period of two years. When he agrees, Velasco finds that he quickly loses his self-respect and the regard of others. He regains those qualities only when he steps forward as the Queen's champion, ready to meet the king on the field of honour.

Before the duel can take place, however, the assembled courtiers protest the proceeding, and Muretto steps forward to explain his role in manipulating Alphonso's mind. Finally, Alphonso is convinced of the Queen's innocence, and repents his past harshness; their rocky relationship reaches a new tolerance and understanding. A humbled Salassa also resolves to give up her vain and selfish ways to be a fit wife for Velasco.

The play's comic relief is supplied by a group of minor characters – two quarrelling followers of Alphonso, the astrologer Pynto and a bluff captain named Bufo; plus Velasco's servant Mopas and the matchmaker/bawd Madame Shaparoon.

The Velasco/Salassa subplot derives from Novel 13 in the Histoires Tragiques of François de Belleforest.
