= Sarah Blackborow =

Quaker polemicist

Sarah Blackborow (fl. 1650s – 1660s) was the English author of religious tracts, which strongly influenced Quaker thinking on social problems and the theological position of women. She was one of several prominent female activists in the early decades of the Society of Friends, notable also for originating a scheme to distribute aid to London prisoners.

== Life ==
Little is known of Blackborow's personal life. She is stated to have been the wife of William Blackborow of Austin's parish in the City of London, to have come from a "prosperous family of London", to have been the organizer of the first Women's Meeting among Quakers, and to have remained in touch with James Nayler after his condemnation by George Fox. Furthermore, "Sarah Blackborow, an educated matron, was the originator of a system to collect and distribute aid to prisoners in London jails."

== Tracts ==
Blackborow's importance to the history of social thinking and theology rests mainly on four tracts, which she published in London:

- A Visit to the Spirit in Prison... (1658)
- Herein is held forth the Gift and Good-will of God to the World, and how it is tendered (1659)
- The Just and Equall Ballance Discovered (1660)
- The Oppressed Prisoners' Complaint (1662)

These have been quoted and catalogued down the centuries. Her writing has been described in modern times as "richly biblical and moving".

One concern of Blackborow's is that God speaks directly through Man, both male and female: "What I have seen and known, and heard and felt, that I declare unto you, and my witness is true; if I bore witness of my self, it were not true; but my witness stands in him [God]" (A Visit..., p. 7). She was among several women who actively propagated Quaker ideas in a period when this was quite unknown in England. As Mack sums up statistically (p. 171n), "Quaker women wrote 220 tracts of the 3853 published before 1700. Eighty-two of the 650 authors were women." Her emphasis on love in the same pamphlet was unusual among Quaker writers of the period: "Oh! love truth and its testimony, that into my mother's house you all may come, and into the chamber of her that conceived me, where you may embrace, and be embraced.... Love is his name, love is his nature, love is his life.... See the seed of the Woman and the seed of the Serpent... and... see birth each of these bring forth; the wombs they are conceived in, which it is that bears, and it is that is barren" (pp. 10–12).

Blackborow's interpretations of the writings of St Paul show deep study of them. She "accuses the priests of speaking without the 'Light', which means that they should be silent. Inverting the dominant reading, she cites St Paul in order to silence them: 'wherever they found either the Male or the Female out of the power, not learned of their Husband the Head, they were forbidden to Prayer or Prophesie.'"

Apart from pressing for the admission of women into preaching and for their recognition in religious inspiration, she takes the argument into the established church camp in The Just... (p. 13), criticizing "the 'Priests' who 'teach the people to neglect the witnesses of God in their consciences, telling them it is of their nature, and persuading them it's not sufficient to... give power over sin,' [claiming] instead that Christ 'is become Teacher himselfe, and his Sheepe heare his voyce; and not one of them can follow a hireling, who are strangers to that Teaching.'" She goes on to address the question of women speaking in church. Similar arguments were put forward later in the century by Elizabeth Bathurst.

Another modern study notes: "Sarah Blackborow, echoing Paul, writes, 'Christ the power was one in the male and in the female, one Spirit, one Light, one life, one power, which brings forth the same witness and ministers forth itself, in the males as in the female'" (The Just...p. 14).

== Possible identity ==
Sarah Blackborow has been provisionally identified with Sarah Blackberry, who had much to do with founding an early Women's Meeting of the Friends. Short writings under that name appear in works by James Nayler (1657) and Richard Hubberthorne (1663). An account of the involvement of Blackberry or Blackborow with Nayler, whose ideas were rejected by most leading Quakers, and of an official rebuke she received in 1657, has been given by Kate Peters.

== External resource ==
- The Digital Quaker Library at Earlham School of Religion has the online text of A Visit to the Spirit in Prison. Retrieved 8 April 2015.
- "Other Blackborow texts online are listed here". onlinebooks.library.upenn.edu.
