= The City Madam =

Comedy written by Philip Massinger

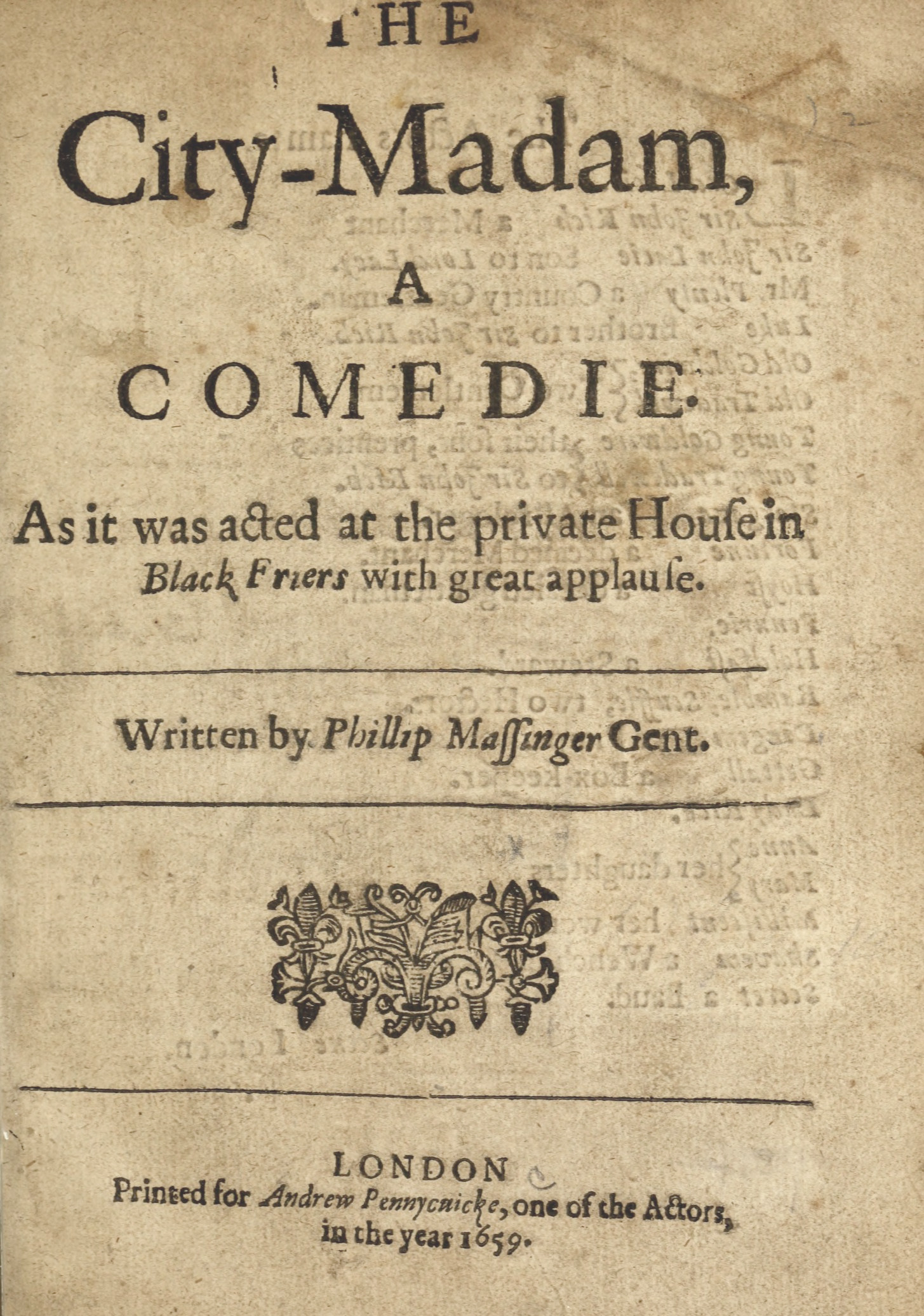
Title page of the 1659 impression of The City Madam, printed for Andrew Pennycuicke

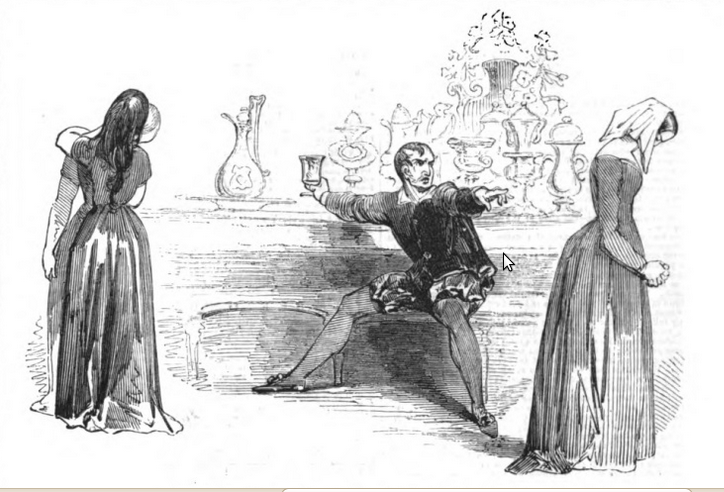
Scene from an 1845 London performance at Sadler's Wells Theatre

The City Madam is a Caroline era comedy written by Philip Massinger. It was licensed by Sir Henry Herbert, the Master of the Revels, on 25 May 1632 and was acted by the King's Men at the Blackfriars Theatre. It was printed in quarto in 1658 by the stationer Andrew Pennycuicke, who identified himself as "one of the Actors" in the play. A second edition followed in 1659. Pennycuicke dedicated the play (Massinger was long dead) to Ann, Countess of Oxford—or at least most of the surviving copies bear a dedication to her; but others are dedicated to any one of four other individuals.

No direct source for the play has been identified, other than Massinger's own earlier play, A New Way to Pay Old Debts, which was modelled on Thomas Middleton's A Trick to Catch the Old One. Specific connections have been cited between The City Madam and Shakespeare's Measure for Measure (regarding Sir John Frugal's pretended absence and masquerade), Ben Jonson's Volpone (Luke Frugal's rhapsodising over his wealth), and Rollo, Duke of Normandy (Stargaze's astrological verbiage), among other works.

The City Madam was adapted into a version titled A Cure for Pride in 1675. The original version may have been revived in 1771, and was definitely performed in 1783 at Theatre Royal, Drury Lane. A play founded on The City Madam, entitled Riches; or, The Wife and Brother, by Sir James Bland Burges, was brought out with success at the Lyceum in 1810.

== Synopsis ==
Sir John Frugal is a merchant whose brother, Luke Frugal, has been to prison and has no money left. Out of charity, Sir John Frugal has invited him to live in his house. Luke is employed there as an under-apprentice, a mere servant who is scorned by Sir John Frugal's wife, Lady Frugal, the eponymous city madam, and her two daughters Anne and Mary. Frugal's apprentices, Goldwire Junior and Tradewell Junior, both pity poor Master Luke.

John Frugal's debtors, Hoist, Fortune and Penury, come to his house to ask for his clemency and with the help of Luke Frugal, who waxes lyrical on the benefits of charity, they convince him into granting them a new delay to pay him back. Luke then convinces his brother's apprentices to steal from their master by forging his accounts. They agree to cheat him out of his money because they would like to become city gallants. Goldwire Junior has an affair with a prostitute called Shave'em and wants to buy clothes for her by swindling his master.

Encouraged by their haughty mother, Lady Frugal, both Anne and Mary reject their suitors Sir Maurice Lacy, son of Lord Lacy, and Mr. Plenty, a country gentleman. They feel ridiculed and complain to Sir John Frugal about his wife and daughters' vanity and pretentiousness. Lady Frugal is angry towards her astrologer, Stargaze, who had predicted a great day for marriages.

Shave'em the whore is visited by two of her customers, Ramble and Scuffle, but she rejects them, pretending that she has become a lady. Both men laugh at her and when Shave'em threatens them with a knife, Ramble draws his sword. Goldwire comes to her rescue dressed up as a Justice of the Peace accompanied by Shave'em's procurer, Ding'em, disguised as a constable, and musicians disguised as watchmen.

The characters then learn from Lord Lacy that Master John Frugal has left his house to go to a monastery and that he has bestowed all his goods to his brother Luke, who is surprised by such a reversal of fortune. Lord Lacy also tells Luke that his brother has requested him to welcome in his house some Indians from Virginia whom he could convert to Christianity. Sir John Frugal, Sir Maurice Lacy, and Plenty, painted and disguised as Indians and talking gibberish, are then introduced to Master Luke.

All of John Frugal's former debtors come back to Master Luke and tell him they might soon be able to pay him back. Master Luke says that he will give money to both apprentices Goldwire and Tradewell and implies that he would like to meet Shave'em. He is welcomed as a munificent benefactor among them. Goldwire even proposes to procure Shave'em to him. But Master Luke reveals his plot by having Shave'em, Ding'em, the apprentices and his debtors all arrested. He treats Lady Frugal and her daughters with disdain and obliges them to wear coarse clothes in order to teach them humility.

Sir John, disguised as an Indian, proposes to his brother to sacrifice Lady Frugal and her daughters in a Satanic ritual (Indians were supposed to worship the devil in Jacobean England). Master Luke agrees to send them to Virginia to be sacrificed in a Satanic ritual. He then receives his apprentices' fathers, Goldwire Senior and Tradewell Senior, but asks from them a prohibitive sum of money to take their sons back into his service.

Sir John Frugal finally reveals his true identity and restores order. He wants his brother Luke to be sent to Virginia to atone for the wrongs that he has done.

== Production ==
The play is not often performed, but it was part of the 2011 season of the Royal Shakespeare Company in Stratford-upon-Avon in a production directed by Dominic Hill.
