= The Three Ladies of London =

Elizabethan comedy

- Written by: Robert Wilson (attributed)
- Subject: Usury, social corruption, philo-Semitism
- Genre: Comedy, Morality play
- Setting: London, allegorical

Premiere
- Date: c. 1581

The Three Ladies of London is an Elizabethan comedy about usury that was probably first performed in 1581; it was published in a quarto edition in both 1584 and 1592. The play is unusual and noteworthy as a philo-Semitic response to the prevailing anti-Semitism of Elizabethan drama and in contemporaneous English society more generally.

== Date, authorship, publication ==
The play was first published in 1584 by the bookseller Roger Warde of Holborn; a second edition appeared in 1592, published by John Danter of Smithfield. The title page of both editions describe the play as "right excellent and famous", "a perfect pattern for all estates to look into, and a work right worthy to be marked." They also assign the play's authorship to "R. W."

The consensus of modern scholarly and critical opinion identifies "R. W." as the comic actor and playwright Robert Wilson; strong commonalities among three plays, The Three Ladies of London, its sequel The Three Lords and Three Ladies of London (printed 1590), and The Cobbler's Prophecy (printed 1594), indicate that all three dramas were written by the same person. Three Ladies appears to date from the year 1581; an allusion to the (temporary) restoration of Peter's Pence by the Roman Catholic Queen Mary in the winter of 1554–55, as having occurred 26 years earlier, favours that dating. The proclamation controlling usury issued on 19 May 1581 would have made the play's subject topical at that time; Queen Elizabeth's 1571 statute against usury was scheduled to expire in 1581, making the topic a matter of public interest.

In his Plays Confuted in Five Actions (1582), Stephen Gosson provided a description of the story of The Three Ladies of London that does not match the extant version of the play – perhaps indicating that Wilson revised the work between its premier and its first publication. The revision might have been provoked by negative reactions to the original – Gosson's, and the play London Against the Three Ladies (see below).

== Form and plot ==
In its form and structure, The Three Ladies of London looks back to the medieval allegory and the morality play, with characters who are personifications of abstract qualities rather than distinct individuals. The three ladies of the title are the Ladies Lucre, Love, and Conscience; the story shows Lady Lucre gaining control over Love and Conscience with the help of Dissimulation, Fraud, Simony, and Usury. Their regime of greed and deception penetrates the Baker's house, the Chandler's, Tanner's, and Weaver's houses too. Lady Lucre forces Lady Love into a marriage with Dissimulation; Lady Conscience protests vainly when Usury murders Hospitality ("Farewell, Lady Conscience; you shall have Hospitality in London nor England no more"). When Lady Conscience is reduced to selling brooms to survive, Lucre makes Conscience her keeper of a house of sexual assignation. Diligence, Simplicity, Sincerity, Tom Beggar, Peter Pleaseman the parson, and similar figures populate the play. In the final scene, the upright judge Nicholas Nemo ("Nemo" being Latin for "No one") attempts to restore order to society, through harsh punishments of the three Ladies.

The Levantine Jewish moneylender Gerontius is a supporting character; but his portrayal as an honest businessman and a generous, good-natured, moral person is diametrically opposed to the standard image of the grasping and ruthless Jewish usurer. In contrast, it is the Christian Italian merchant Mercadorus, who borrows money from Gerontius but refuses to repay, who is the economic villain. Gerontius is shocked by Mercadorus's assertion that he would convert to Islam to avoid repayment.

Curiously, Wilson makes his personified Usury an Englishman of Jewish descent. The play's villains tend to be cosmopolitan foreigners: Dissimulation is a "Mongrel," half Italian and half Dutch, while Fraud is half French and half Scottish; Simony is a Roman.

The play is written in a very rough and uneven verse, a jumble of alexandrine and heptameter or fourteener meter:

But senior Mercadorus tell me, did ye serve me well or no?
That having gotten my money would seem the country to forego:
You know I sent you two thousand ducats for three months' space,
And ere the time came you got another thousand by flattery and your smooth face.
So when the time came that I should have received my money,
You were not to be found but was fled out of the country:
Surely if we that be Jews should deal so one with another,
We should not be trusted again of our own brother....

== Dramatic context ==
E. K. Chambers argued that The Three Ladies of London may have responded to the prior anonymous lost play The Jew (1579 or earlier), which portrayed the conventional social attitude toward "the bloody minds of usurers." Three Ladies, in its turn, is thought to have prompted a hostile response in another anonymous lost play, London Against the Three Ladies (c. 1582). These plays may have influenced important later plays on the subject, including Christopher Marlowe's The Jew of Malta and William Shakespeare's The Merchant of Venice. Wilson's play itself has been perceived as, if not a source, then an "analogue" of Shakespeare's play.

== See also ==
- The Jews' Tragedy
