= Anything for a Quiet Life =

Jacobean stage play by Thomas Middleton and John Webster

Anything for a Quiet Life is a Jacobean stage play, a city comedy written by Thomas Middleton and John Webster. Topical allusions suggest the play was written most likely in 1621.

== Authorship ==
The play was first published in quarto in 1662 by the bookseller Francis Kirkman, with a title-page attribution of authorship to Middleton. Yet while Middleton's distinctive style is clearly present in some portions of the text, there are other sections that suggested to some critics the presence of a second hand. The early twentieth-century critic H. Dugdale Sykes was the first person to argue in favour of Webster as the second author. Sykes' hypothesis won acceptance from a range of other scholars. David Lake, in his study of authorship questions in Middleton's canon, confirms the presence of Webster's hand, and gives the following breakdown for the respective shares of the two writers.

Webster – Act I; Act II, scene i; Act IV, scene i;
Middleton – Act II, scenes ii and iii; Act III; Act IV, scene iii;
Both – Act IV, scene ii; Act V, scene i.

== Characters ==
- Lord Beaufort
- Sir Francis Cressingham, an alchemist
- Lady Cressingham, his second wife
- Young Cressingham, his son by his first marriage
- Old Franklin, a country gentleman
- Young Franklin, his son, a sea captain, companion to Young Cressingham
- Master Walter Camlet, Citizen and Mercer (i.e. cloth-dealer)
- Mistress Rachel Camlet, his wife
- Knavesbe, a lawyer, and pander to his wife
- Sib Knavesbe, his wife
- Selenger, page to Lord Beaufort
- Saunder, steward to Sir Francis
- George, apprentice to Camlet
- Ralph, apprentice to Camlet
- A Surveyor
- Sweetball, a barber-surgeon
- Barber'S Boy
- Fleshhook, a yeoman
- Counterbuff, a sergeant
- Two Children of Sir Francis, boarded out to Camlet
- Margarita, a French bawd
- 3 Or 4 Citizens or creditors

== Synopsis ==
Act I
Sir Francis Cressingham is being chastised by his friend Lord Beaufort for having recently married a much younger wife, soon after his previous wife's death. His new wife was raised in the court, and Beaufort worries that she will be profligate in her spending. Sir Francis replies that she may be young but she is sober and pious. Walter Camlet, a citizen and cloth merchant, enters, complaining that his own wife is always nagging him. He is looking after Sir Francis's two youngest children, who have been sent to him to be out of the way of their new stepmother. Knavesbe enters: a corrupt lawyer, with a fair and witty wife. He seeks advancement from Beaufort, who invites him to his house to work out a suitable arrangement. Young Cressingham (who has quarrelled with his father over his remarriage) and Young Franklin contemplate how they might improve their economic circumstances; after contemplating going to sea, Young Franklin says he has a plan to get money out of Camlet. Lady Cressingham enters, demanding richer and better clothes from her husband. Camlet pities Sir Francis, who has got himself caught by such a woman. Lady Cressingham tells her husband that she has heard about a land-deal: he should sell his estates and in return buy new land worth more. She also insists he give up the practice of alchemy. He agrees to be advised by her in all things.

Act II
Knavesbe and Mistress Knavesbe at home. He tries to make her confess that she has been unfaithful to him, telling her that he himself has slept around. This is, it emerges, part of his scheme with Lord Beaufort: Beaufort wants to sleep with her, and Knavesbe has agreed to prostitute his wife in exchange for preferment. She is horrified. Beaufort enters and flirts with her; she is non-committal. When the two men exit, she reflects: she is shocked at the plan's wickedness, but has a scheme to derail the plot. Meanwhile, Mistress Camlet is suspicious of her husband, believing Cressingham's two children who are boarded in her house to be Camlet's bastards. Young Franklin and Young Cressingham, in disguise as a rich knight and his tailor, arrive at the Camlets' shop and persuade Camlet to let them take some very expensive fabrics on credit. Camlet's apprentice, Ralph, delivers; he is parted from the goods and left alone with Sweetball the barber-surgeon, who, persuaded that Ralph is suffering from venereal disease, threatens to cut off his penis. Ralph makes a swift exit, leaving the fabric behind.

Act III
Lord Beaufort's house; Knavesbe's wife turns up and flirts with Beaufort's page Selenger. When Beaufort agrees to see her, she "confesses" that she is in love with Selenger, and will give herself to Beaufort so long as she is given the page in return. He is disgusted by this insult and sends her back home, vowing vengeance on her husband. She exults at having kept her honesty in this way and hopes Beaufort will carry out his threat against Knavesbe, whom she now hates. Meanwhile, Camlet catches up with Young Franklin and attempts to arrest him for the theft of the fabric; Franklin, with the help of a passing French bawd, manages to persuade Camlet that he is a Frenchman and it is a case of mistaken identity. George enters to say that Mistress Camlet will never trouble her husband again: enraged at the continuing presence of the children, she has left home to stay with her cousin, Knavesbe, and insists that she wants a divorce. Camlet is distraught: for all his wife's shrewishness, he loves her and wants her back. He resolves to send the children home.

Act IV
Sir Francis is distraught: he seems to have given over all his power to his wife, who is having his lands surveyed before organising the sale. Young Cressingham must also sign the bill of sale, and he laments at selling the inheritance; he brings in his two younger siblings (back from the Camlets') to sway their father's heart. Sir Francis, moved, refuses to sign; Lady Cressingham enters and flies into a rage, insisting that the lands be sold and new ones bought in Ireland. She threatens to leave her husband, never sleep with him again, and so on. Meanwhile, Mistress Knavesbe returns home to her husband, who is eager to hear how her assignation went. She affects to put on airs, insisting that she will never sleep with him again now she has tasted the life of the rich. He is a little worried but happy to reflect on the prosperity that lies ahead once he is rewarded. George enters, with an invitation for the couple to come to Camlet's wedding: he has decided that he too wants a divorce, and has taken up with a new woman. They tell Mistress Camlet and she is furious, resolving to go and kill everyone involved in her jealous frenzy. But it is all a plot; George has arranged for Margarita (the French bawd of Act III) to pose as Camlet's new bride. Mistress Camlet is madly jealous, but when she discovers that it is all a set-up, she repents; she loves her husband really.

Act V
Young Cressingham goes to his father's house, where Sir Francis is miserable: he has sold his land as his wife wanted and now he is treated like a child, given a meagre allowance. Old Franklin is in mourning; his son has faked his own death and is in disguise as a servingman. Young Cressingham accuses his stepmother of ruining the family; she is bold and laughs at him, and says, mysteriously, that hereafter she will treat him quite differently. He curses her, hoping she will die repenting her actions. Old Franklin pays off his "dead" son's debts, including those incurred by his theft of goods from Camlet. Meanwhile, Knavesbe claims his reward from Lord Beaufort, only to be told that his wife did not fulfil the bargain, that she has instead run off with his page. Knavesbe vaguely resolves to commit suicide. Mrs Knavesbe enters with the "page" and reveals all: the page is actually Young Cressingham's wife, left with Lord Beaufort in disguise to protect her virtue. Lady Cressingham then enters and announces that she has only been testing her husband with her feigned shrewishness and avarice; she wanted to teach him to be wise and thrifty. Sir Francis is happy that his wife is really kind and virtuous, and he takes his lands back. Knavesbe apologises to his wife for his behaviour and she forgives him. Young Franklin is revealed to be alive, which his father in fact knew all along (his "death" allowed Old Franklin to get away with only paying half his son's debts). All are reconciled, and Lord Beaufort invites everyone home to dinner.
