= The Kalender of Shepherdes =

16th-century book

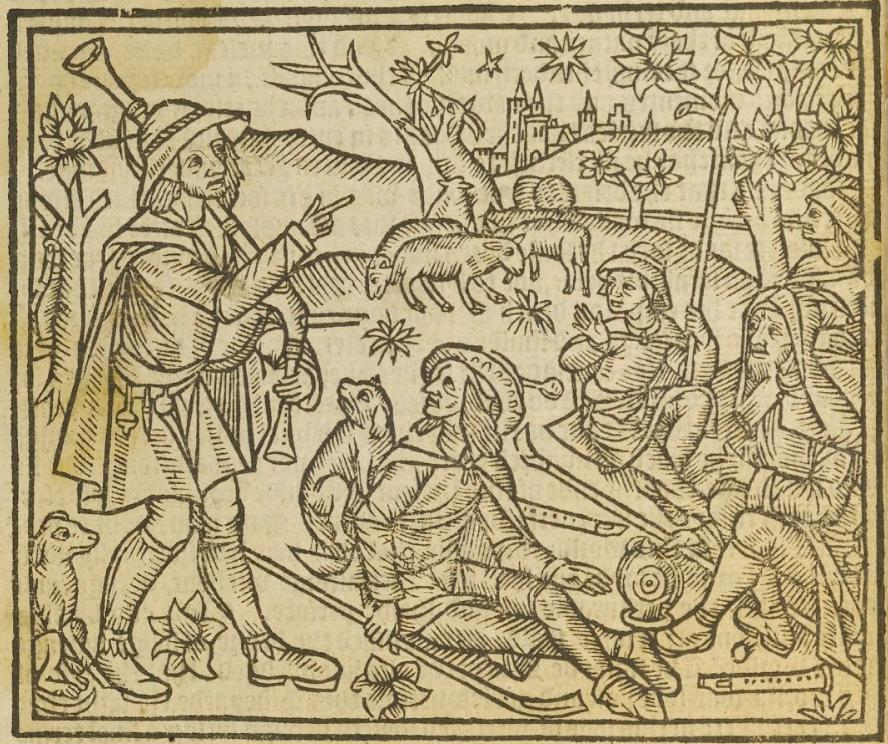
Kalender of Shepherdes (page detail).

The Kalender of Shepherdes, also known as the Kalendar and Compost of Shepherds. was an incunable almanac first published in the 1490s in Paris as the Compost et Kalendrier de Bergiers.

The first English edition was a poor translation into a Scots dialect, published in 1503, but Richard Pynson released an improved translation in 1506 and Wynkyn de Worde produced another in 1508. It continued to be reprinted throughout the 16th Century

There are several different topics covered in different versions of the Kalender; the exact contents vary between editions. They include poetry, health advice, astrological information, calendars, and religious instructions. The latter provide the bulk of the material in the Kalender, and were designed to provide instruction in Christian belief and practice for lay people.

The Kalender is also noteworthy for its vivid woodcut illustrations, including illustrations for an eyewitness account by Lazarus of Hell.

It continued to be a best-seller throughout the sixteenth century.
