= The Widow (play) =

Jacobean play

The Widow is a Jacobean stage play first published in 1652, but written decades earlier.

On the limited evidence available, the play is usually dated to c. 1615–17, partially on the basis of a "yellow bands" reference to the execution of Mrs. Anne Turner (15 November 1615) for her part in the murder of Sir Thomas Overbury.

== Authorship ==
The play was entered into the Stationers' Register on 12 April 1652, and published later that year in quarto by the bookseller Humphrey Moseley. The title page assigns The Widow to Ben Jonson, John Fletcher, and Thomas Middleton, though the consensus of modern scholarship judges the play to be the work of Middleton alone.

The play is known to have been in the repertory of the King's Men. The tripartite attribution is repeated in Alexander Gough's address "To the Reader" prefacing the quarto text; Gough acted with the King's Men in the 1626–36 era. Nineteenth and early twentieth century critics, like E. H. C. Oliphant, made attempts to defend the original authorial attribution; but modern techniques of textual analysis find no evidence of the hands of either Jonson or Fletcher in the play, and a consistent pattern of evidence favouring Middleton. (The Widow is included in the 1656 play lists of Rogers and Ley [see The Careless Shepherdess] and Edward Archer [see The Old Law] as the work of Middleton alone.)

== Characters ==
- Brandino, a fat old Justice of the Peace
- Martino, his old clerk
- Philippa, Valeria's sister, Brandino's handsome young second wife
- Violetta, Philippa's unmarried waiting woman
- Valeria, a rich widow
- Two old men, Suitors to Valeria
- Ricardo, a handsome gentleman, in debt, suitor to Valeria
- Francisco, a handsome curly-haired twenty-one-year-old gentleman, Ricardo's friend
- Attilio, another gentleman, friend to Francisco and Ricardo
- Ansaldo, a handsome youth
- Latrocinio, leader of a band of thieves
- Occulto, Silvio, Stratio, and Fiducio, Latrocinio's confederates
- Officers
- Servants

== Synopsis ==
=== Act I ===
Scene 1: Brandino's home

Francisco (a young gentleman) goes to the home of Brandino (an elderly judge) to obtain a warrant from Brandino's clerk, Martino. Martino is happy to see Francisco because Francisco is a good customer – he comes to the judge's home to obtain warrants quite regularly. In an aside, Francisco reveals that the real reason he comes to the house so often is because he is in love with Brandino's wife, Philippa. Philippa appears on a balcony above with her waiting-woman, Violetta. The women admire Francisco's curly hair and good looks. Violetta drops a letter for Francisco from the balcony and waits to see if he will pick it up. Martino finishes writing the warrant and Francisco exits. Philippa asks Martino to pick up a letter that has been left on the floor. Martino reads the letter out loud. It is a love letter for Philippa from Francisco. Philippa pretends to be scandalised (presumably for Martino's sake). Brandino enters. Philippa shows him the letter. Brandino is angered, but he is not sure how he should deal with the situation. Philippa tells him that he should confront Francisco with the letter to shame him.

Scene 2: A street

Francisco discusses his love for Philippa with his friends Ricardo and Attilio. Ricardo is a debt-ridden spendthrift and great ladies man. He brags that he has loved a thousand women, half of them married. He is one of the many suitors trying to marry Philippa's sister, Valeria, a wealthy widow (and the title character). Francisco worries that he is too shy to talk to Philippa. Ricardo gives him some lessons on how to talk to women. They engage in some role-playing exercises with each gentleman taking turns in the role of the woman. Ricardo tells Francisco and Attilio that he has a plan to trick Valeria into marrying him. According to the plan, Attilio and Francisco will hide while Ricardo manipulates a conversation with Valeria to make it seem as though she has agreed to marry him. As soon as Valeria has stepped into Ricardo's trap, Francisco and Attilio will reveal themselves and claim to be official witnesses to the betrothal (verbal promises could be legally binding in Renaissance England, but this scenario is extremely far-fetched). Francisco and Attilio agree to follow Ricardo's plan. Ricardo and Attilio exit. Brandino and Martino enter to confront Francisco. Brandino hands him what he believes to be Francisco's letter to Philippa, but is in fact a letter from Philippa to Francisco suggesting a meeting that night. Francisco reads the letter. He is pleased by Philippa's cunning. Brandino and Martino threaten to kill Francisco. Francisco apologises and reminds Brandino that his late father was one of Brandino's best friends. Brandino agrees to forgive Francisco. They part peacefully.

=== Act II ===
Scene 1: Brandino's house

Ricardo visits Valeria at Brandino's house. Playing to the widow's stated distaste for men who wear make-up and put on airs, Ricardo claims that everything about him is genuine. Francisco and Attilio sneak into the room and observe the conversation from a hiding place. Ricardo tricks Valeria into holding his hand and making what might be construed as a betrothal promise. Francisco and Attilio reveal themselves and congratulate Valeria. Valeria is confused. Francisco and Attilio claim that they have just witnessed a betrothal promise. Valeria is outraged by the ruse. She throws the gentlemen out of her house and vows to take them all to court. Ricardo warns her that the law will force her to marry him sooner or later. The gentlemen exit. Two of Valeria's elderly suitors (identified only as "First Suitor" and "Second Suitor") enter. Valeria tells the suitors about Ricardo's ploy. The First Suitor offers to have Ricardo and his friends arrested. Valeria is very grateful for his help. He exits. In an aside, the Second Suitor notes that his rival (the First Suitor) has gained an advantage with Valeria by prosecuting the gentlemen. He decides to counter this advantage by helping Ricardo out. He asks Valeria to describe the supposed "betrothal contract" in detail. When she has given him all the details, he claims that the betrothal is valid and declares that he will also act as Ricardo's witness.

Scene 2: A street

Francisco reads his letter from Philippa, in which she instructs him to meet her that evening at Brandino's country home. The First Suitor enters with two officers. The officers arrest Francisco. Ricardo and Attilio enter and are quickly arrested as well. The First Suitor tells the three prisoners that they will be taken to prison immediately if they cannot pay bail. The Second Suitor enters and pays Ricardo and Attilio's bail. The First Suitor curses him. Ricardo begs the Second Suitor to pay Francisco's bail as well. The Second Suitor refuses. Francisco worries that the arrest will prevent him from meeting Philippa. Brandino enters with Martino. At Martino's urging, Brandino agrees to pay Francisco's bail.

=== Act III ===
Scene 1: A country road

The thief, Latrocinio tries to rob a young traveller named Ansaldo, but the robbery is prevented when Ansaldo produces a pistol and orders Latrocinio to sing as punishment. Latrocinio's confederate, Stratio, enters posing as the servant of a concerned knight who witnessed the attempted robbery from a nearby hilltop. He asks Ansaldo if he needs any help. Latrocinio runs away. Stratio tells Ansaldo that he should have shot Latrocinio. Ansaldo confesses that his pistol is not loaded. Stratio produces a weapon and threatens Ansaldo. Latrocinio, Occulto, Silvio, Fiducio, and the rest of Latrocinio's band of thieves enter. They strip Ansaldo to his shirtsleeves, take all of his belongings, and leave him tied to a tree.

Scene 2: Brandino's country home

Philippa and Violetta wait for Francisco at Brandino's country home. Phillipa is annoyed because Francisco is late. Ansaldo approaches the house (still stripped to his shirtsleeves). He is too shy to knock on the door, so he waits by the gate and listens for signs of activity. Francisco enters. He complains that his arrest has made him late for his date with Philippa. Ansaldo mistakes Francisco for one of the thieves and withdraws. Francisco sees Ansaldo standing by the gate in his shirtsleeves and mistakes him for the ghost of his father. He interprets the supposed apparition as a warning to forgo his meeting with Philippa and exits. Ansaldo works up the courage to knock on the door. Violetta answers the door and welcomes Ansaldo inside.

Scene 3: Brandino's country home

Philippa is still complaining about Francisco's absence. Violetta enters and announces Francisco's arrival. Philippa tells her to send Ansaldo in. Philippa praises her fortune for sending her a "sweet young gallant" to replace Francisco. Ansaldo and Violetta enter. Ansaldo is dressed in one of Brandino's old suits. Ansaldo thanks Philippa for her hospitality. Philippa is extremely pleased by Ansaldo's youthful good looks. Ansaldo tells Philippa that he has a very important meeting that he has to get to right away. Philippa lends him some money for the voyage. Ansaldo thanks her, promises to pay her back soon, and hurries off. Moments later, Philippa realises that Brandino's old suit is recognisable throughout the area. She worries that Ansaldo might be accused of thievery if he is seen. Violetta tries to catch up with Ansaldo to warn him, but it is too late. Ansaldo is already long gone.

=== Act IV ===
Scene 1: Brandino's country home

Valeria and Ricardo attempt to negotiate a resolution to their dispute. Valeria is accompanied by the First Suitor and Ricardo is accompanied by the Second Suitor. Brandino enters with Martino. Brandino complains that his eyes are sore and Martino complains of a sore tooth. At Valeria's suggestion, Brandino offers Ricardo a thousand dollars if he will drop his lawsuit and leave Valeria alone ("dollar" in this context is the English name for the German thaler, a large silver coin). Ricardo refuses the offer. Violetta enters. Brandino offers Ricardo Violetta's hand in lieu of Valeria's. Ricardo refuses this offer as well.

Scene 2: Latrocinio's phony doctor's office

Latrocinio and his band of thieves set up a doctor's office so they can peddle phony "cures" (for example, a dose of gunpowder is prescribed for an old man with a kidney stone). Latrocinio poses as a physician, and his followers pose as satisfied customers. Ansaldo enters – still wearing Brandino's clothes. He tries to speak to Occulto, who is disguised as a customer. Occulto recognises Ansaldo right away. Ansaldo asks Occulto if he has seen any sign of the band of thieves who robbed him. Occulto says that he has not and exits. Brandino and Martino enter seeking cures for their ailments (sore eyes and a sore tooth). Brandino sees Ansaldo and recognises his suit. He accuses Ansaldo of theft. Martino tries to seize Ansaldo, but Ansaldo punches him, damaging another tooth. Latrocinio enters disguised as a physician. Brandino tells Latrocinio that Ansaldo is a thief. Latrocinio asks Ansaldo how he got Brandino's suit. Ansaldo refuses to tell him for fear of getting the "charitable lady" (Philippa) in trouble. Latrocinio orders his "servants" to seize Ansaldo and carry him off to prison. As soon as Ansaldo has been removed, Latrocinio presents three supposedly "cured" patients (thieves in disguise). Brandino is very impressed. Latrocinio orders his "assistant" (Occulto) to pull Martino's sore tooth while he attends to Brandino's sore eyes. He picks Brandino's pocket while applying a "sore eye treatment," and Occulto picks Martino's pocket while he pulls out the sore tooth. As they prepare to leave, Brandino and Martino notice that their pockets have been picked. Latrocinio says that Ansaldo must have robbed them before he was taken away to prison. Brandino sends Martino to the country house to see if the thief took anything else beside the suit. Apologizing for the inconvenience, he gives Latrocinio his seal ring as collateral for his unpaid medical bills and exits. Occulto enters and tells Latrocinio that Martino's purse contained four blank warrants. The thieves merrily make plans to use the warrants to free some of their friends from prison.

=== Act V ===
Scene 1: Brandino's country home

Philippa and Violetta complain that Ansaldo has failed to repay the money he borrowed. Martino enters and informs Philippa that a "thief" has been apprehended wearing Brandino's old suit. Philippa realises that the "thief" must be Ansaldo. She worries for his safety. Ansaldo enters seeking refuge (Latrocinio and the thieves used the blank warrants to set him free from prison). Philippa and Violetta welcome Ansaldo warmly. They decide to disguise him as a woman to protect him from his pursuers. Ansaldo and Violetta exit. Brandino enters. He tells Philippa that the widow (Valeria) has decided to hand her entire estate over to him. Philippa tells Brandino that she has taken in a young "maid" (Ansaldo) who was robbed by the thieves. Brandino commends Philippa for her charity. He tells her that he has made up with Francisco, whom he has invited to the house for dinner. Francisco enters. Philippa welcomes him, but says she will never trust him (she is still holding a grudge because Francisco failed to show up for their meeting on the previous night). Speaking to himself, Francisco says that he is happy to be able to enter Brandino's home with a clear conscience. Violetta enters with Ansaldo. Ansaldo is dressed as a woman. Francisco falls in love with Ansaldo at first sight. Philippa and Violetta stifle giggles as he proceeds to court her. Francisco and Ansaldo exit together. Brandino and Martino exit shortly thereafter. Philippa looks forward to making an ass out of Francisco by encouraging him to marry Ansaldo. Ansaldo enters. He says that Francisco has been extremely aggressive with his advances. Philippa tells Ansaldo that he should consent to marry Francisco. Ansaldo agrees to go along with the prank. Francisco enters. He asks Ansaldo to marry him. Ansaldo says yes. Brandino enters. Ansaldo and Francisco exit to get married immediately. Philippa and Violetta follow. Valeria enters with Ricardo, the First Suitor, and the Second Suitor. Valeria announces that she has handed her entire estate over to Brandino. She says that she wants to marry a man who wants her for herself, not for her money. The First and Second Suitors immediately withdraw their offers of marriage, but Ricardo says he is still interested. Valeria and Ricardo agree to marry, but there is a problem: Ricardo is burdened by excessive debts. The capricious Second Suitor saves the day by ripping up Ricardo's bonds of debt to facilitate the marriage. His sentiments are gleefully malevolent:

And ever since I knew what malice was,
I always led it sweeter to sow mischief,
Than to receive money; 'tis the finer pleasure.

He wants the couple to marry, to be united in beggary. He predicts that Ricardo will soon "give her a black eye" and "Beat half her teeth out, and that they'll

...break the little household-stuff they have,
With throwing at one another: O sweet sport!

As soon as Ricardo's debts are shredded, Valeria reveals that her deed to Brandino is conditional, a "deed in trust" — it is null and void when she marries, so she will bring her wealth intact to her marriage with Ricardo. Violetta enters laughing. She reports that Francisco and Ansaldo have just been married. Francisco and Ansaldo enter as a married couple. Philippa follows them. Violetta announces that Ansaldo is actually a man, but this assertion is quickly contradicted by the First Suitor, who immediately recognises "Ansaldo" as his absconded daughter, Martia. In a surprising final twist, Martia reveals that she disguised herself as "Ansaldo" after running away from home. The estranged father and daughter quickly repair their rift. Martino ends the play with word that the thieves have been apprehended.
