= Appius and Virginia =

17th-century stage play

Appius and Virginia is an early 17th-century stage play, a tragedy by John Webster (and perhaps Thomas Heywood). It is the third and least famous of his tragedies, after The White Devil and The Duchess of Malfi.

== Heywood ==
On the basis of his distinctive Latinate vocabulary, Thomas Heywood has been suggested as a part-author of the play, though some commentators disagree. (Heywood has also been proposed as a part-author of Webster and Rowley's A Cure for a Cuckold.)

== Date ==
No definite evidence on the play's date of origin or early performance history has survived. Scholars have conjectured dates of authorship any time in the interval between 1608 and 1634. Critics who consider the play crude have favored an early date, and thought of the work as Webster's first venture into the genre of tragedy. Others have focused on the 1625–27 period as perhaps the most likely. It has been argued that Webster was influenced by Shakespeare's classical Roman tragedies, and that he likely wrote his play after the publication of the First Folio in 1623. The play was certainly in existence by 1639, when it was listed among the repertory of Beeston's Boys.

== Publication ==
Webster's play was published late: it was entered into the Stationers' Register on 13 May 1654 by bookseller Richard Marriot, and appeared in print before the end of that year. The original title page assigns the play to Webster, and does not identify the publisher. A second impression of the original quarto, with a new title page, was issued in 1659 by Humphrey Moseley; a third edition followed in 1679.

== Precedents ==
Webster was not the first English Renaissance playwright to dramatize the story of Appius Claudius Crassus and Verginia; another play with the same title and subject matter had been published in 1576, as the work of "R. B.," probably a Richard Bower. The earlier play influenced Webster's treatment.

Beyond the 1576 play, the classical tale was available to Webster and his contemporaries in a variety of forms. Apart from the original Ab Urbe condita of Livy, it appears in The Romance of the Rose, and the Confessio Amantis of John Gower, and The Physician's Tale in The Canterbury Tales of Geoffrey Chaucer. It is also found in the Pecorone of Ser Giovanni Fiorentino (1378), and closer to home in William Painter's Palace of Pleasure (1566–67).

== In the Restoration ==
Webster's play was revived during the Restoration era, in an adaptation by Thomas Betterton called The Roman Virgin, or The Unjust Judge that was acted at Lincoln's Inn Fields in 1670, and was printed in 1679. (Betterton played Virginius, and his wife was Virginia.) Betterton combined elements from the 16th-century play with Websterian material. Later dramatists also dealt with the story: John Dennis's Appius and Virginia was staged at Drury Lane in 1709 (Betterton was Virginius again). At least seven other versions followed.

== Synopsis ==
The play is set in ancient Rome in the time of the Decemvirate, from 451 to 449 BCE. In the opening scene, Appius Claudius is offered membership among the Decemviri; he feigns humility and claims unworthiness for the high office, and accepts only when faced with the penalty for refusal, which is banishment. Yet in private conversation with his closest follower, Marcus Claudius, Appius shows that he actually covets the office and its power, and cynically masks his ambition with an outward show of modesty.

The play's second scene introduces Virginia, her uncle Numitorius, and her betrother, Icilius. Virginia's father Virginius is away commanding the army of Rome; but Icilius brings word that Virginius has suddenly returned to Rome from the field, spurring his horse bloody as he races directly to the Senate. Appius confesses to Marcus Claudius that he lusts after Virginia, and Marcus encourages Appius to exploit his power to obtain the girl; Appius, he says, can easily exert control over Virginius through his position in the state. Before the Senate, Virginius pleads for money for the hungry troops, warning the Senate that the army is close to mutiny. Appius puts him off, promising help "Hereafter." The Senate breaks up, and Virginius pauses only briefly to see his family before returning to the camp, where he manages to stifle the mutiny by the force of his commanding personality.

Virginia is serenaded by musicians she thinks are sent by Icilius; when she learns that they were actually sent by Appius, she rejects his advance. Appius courts her and pursues her with letters and gifts; at first Virginia conceals this from Icilius, but later she reveals all. Icilius meets Appius in private and threatens to kill him if he continues. Appius is outraged by this, and unhappy at the poor results of his pursuit of Virginia. Marcus reveals a bold plan to win the girl: he will use false evidence and perjured testimony to claim that Virginia is not really her father's daughter, but in fact a "bond-slave" belonging to himself.

Virginia is apprehended by Appius's lictors while she is shopping in the market. Marcus brings the legal action before Appius, who makes a pretense of impartiality and even of suspicion and hostility toward Marcus – which does not fool Icilius or Numitorius. Appius tries to stage the trial before Virginius has time to return to Rome, but the general shows up for the hearing dressed like a slave. Before the trial starts, Virginia tells her father that she would rather die than be prostituted to Appius's lust. The rigged hearing goes as Appius and Marcus plan: their unctious Advocate presents false documents, and Appius rules in Marcus's favor. Icilius protests, and is taken into custody. Virginius bows to the demands of honor and to his daughter's words, and stabs Virginia to death in the courtroom. There is outrage, and an attempt to apprehend Virginius, but he escapes back to his troops. He confronts the soldiers with the fact of his deed, and once again wins their backing; he leads the army back to Rome.

The authorities imprison Appius and Marcus and release Icilius from prison to confront Virginius when the general arrives. Icilius is appalled that Virginius has killed his daughter ("thou hast turn'd / My bridal to a funeral"), and the two have a debate on the intertwined considerations of law and justice and honor. The two men join forces to go to the Senate to confront Appius.

Appius and Marcus are produced in chains. Virginius is emotionally drained after the ordeal of his daughter's death at his own hand, and seems ready to pardon Appius. This provokes Icilius. He brings Virginia's body through the streets; the Roman populace, confronted by the sight, becomes passionate for Appius's downfall, and Virginius's resolve is strengthened again. Appius and Marcus are offered swords; Appius uses his to commit suicide, but Marcus lacks the nerve to do the same, and pleads for mercy. He is sent to be executed by the common hangman.

The play's comic relief is supplied by soldiers and servants, led by Virginia's servant Corbulo.

== The critical response ==
Critics have differed widely and radically over the worth of Webster's Appius and Virginia. For Dugdale Sykes, the play is "Firmly constructed, lucid in style, and with a simple, coherent plot," which "is utterly unlike The White Devil and The Duchess of Malfy [sic], those profounder and more poetic tragedies...." Other critics have rendered harsher judgements, regarding the play's black-and-white morality as simplistic and uninteresting compared to Webster's other, more complex tragedies.
