= The Fatal Contract =

Play by William Heminges

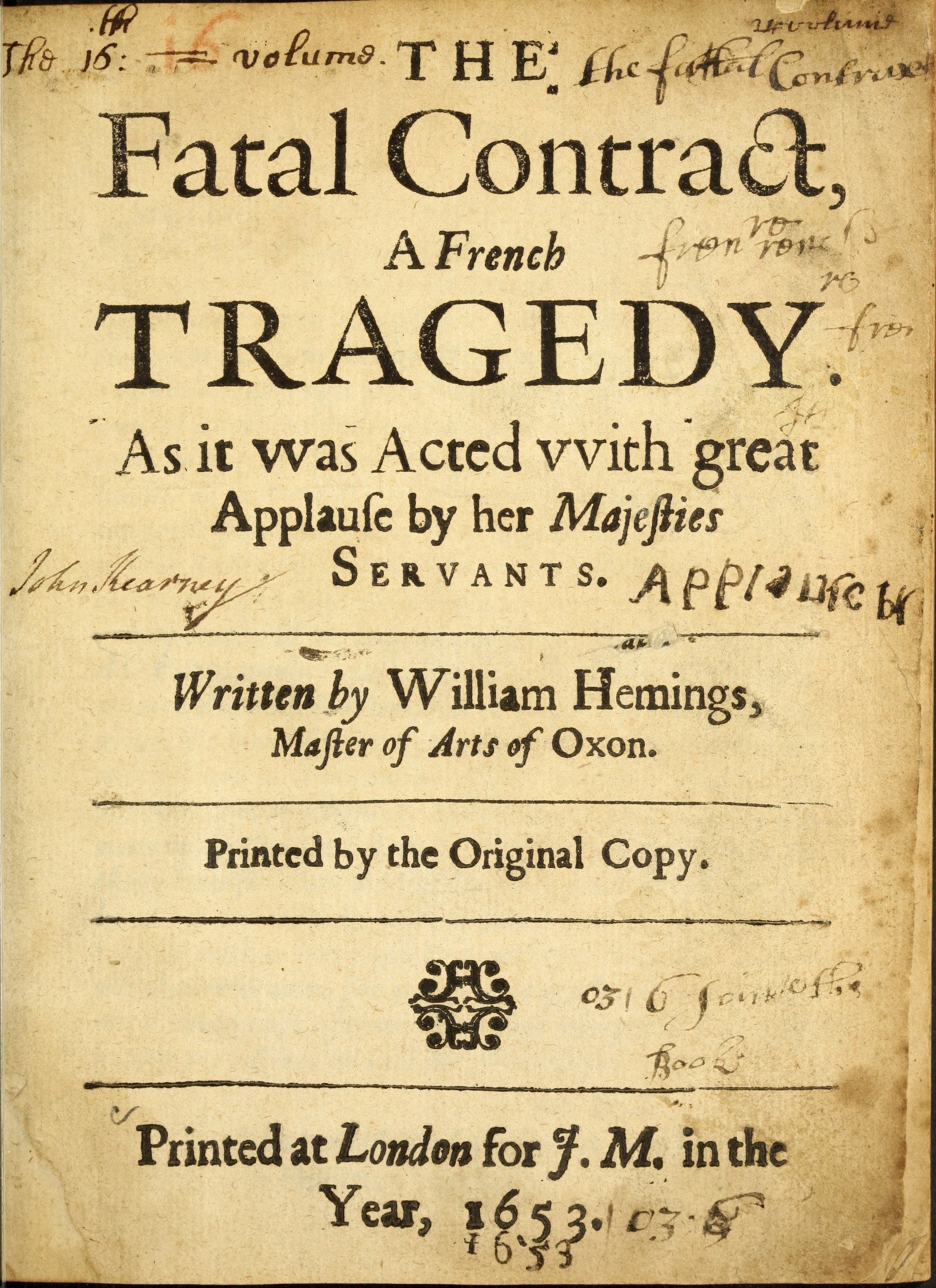
Title page of the first edition of The Fatal Contract (1653)

The Fatal Contract, a French Tragedy is a Caroline era stage play, written by William Heminges. The play has been regarded as one of the most extreme of the revenge tragedies or "tragedies of blood," like The Spanish Tragedy and Titus Andronicus, that constitute a distinctive subgenre of English Renaissance theatre. In this "most graphic Caroline revenge tragedy...Heminges tops his predecessors' grotesque art by creating a female character, Chrotilda, who disguises herself as a black Moorish eunuch" and "instigates most of the play's murder and mayhem."

== Performance and publication ==
The Fatal Contract was most likely written in 1638–39, and was acted, probably in the latter year, by Queen Henrietta's Men at the Salisbury Court Theatre. Heminges's primary source for plot materials was the General Inventory of the History of France by Jean de Serres, published in English in 1607. The play was first published in a quarto originally printed for "J. M." in 1653, and reissued the following year with a new title page by the actor turned stationer Andrew Pennycuicke. The booksellers dedicated the play to the Earl and Countess of Nottingham. The preface, co-signed by "A. T." (thought to be actor Anthony Turner), indicates that Heminges had died before publication. A second edition, printed for bookseller Richard Gammon, followed in 1661.

During the Restoration, Elkanah Settle adapted Heminges's play into his Love and Revenge (1675). The original 1653 text was again adapted in 1687 and issued under a new title, The Eunuch. Although the action remained unchanged, the anonymous adapter omitted some lines, borrowed others from Settle's Love and Revenge, and expanded a few scenes.

There are modern editions by Anne Hargrove (1978), Carol Morley (2006), and Andrea Stevens (2020, the only modern-spelling general edition).

== Influence of Shakespeare and other Elizabethan dramatists ==
The Fatal Contract owes a debt to the works of earlier dramatists. Similarities with passages in the works of Beaumont and Fletcher have been noted. Among the writers of the later Jacobean and the Caroline eras, Heminges was perhaps the one most deeply influenced by Shakespeare, and the play is thick with borrowings from Shakespeare's works. It has particularly close links with Hamlet, Othello, and King Lear, and commonalities with other works in Shakespeare's canon.

The play's verbal echoes of Shakespeare are too numerous to detail. One example may stand for the rest: with Clotair's "And rise black vengeance from the depth of hell," compare Othello's "Arise, black vengeance, from the hollow hell!" (Othello, III,3,447). With Fredigond stabbing her portrait, compare Lucrece attacking a portrait with her nails (The Rape of Lucrece, lines 1562–68); rage and a rape context are common to both. Stabbed portraits also can be found in the plays The Noble Spanish Soldier (printed 1634) and James Shirley's The Traitor (acted 1631, printed 1635).

== Blackface ==
"By 1638 the disguised Moor had become a theatrical convention." Richard Brome's The English Moor (c. 1637), almost contemporaneous with Heminges's play, is a noteworthy example.

== Synopsis ==
The Fatal Contract is set in the earliest period of the French monarchy. Childerick is king; Fredigond, his wife and queen, is the play's villainess; Clotair and Clovis are their sons. In the play's backstory, Clotair raped Chrotilda, the sister of two young noblemen named Lamot and Dumain (the play's virtuous characters). One of their relatives mistakenly killed the queen's brother Clodimer in revenge, thinking him the rapist; Fredigond is now quietly and systematically exterminating the members of Chrotilda's family. In a macabre touch, the queen maintains a group portrait of the family; she paints in the members – grandmother, parents, infant child – as she kills them off. (In a sudden frenzy of rage, Fredigond stabs the painting.) The queen is assisted in her villainy by a Moorish eunuch called, with brutal literateness, Castrato. Childerick is poisoned by Fredigond; Lamot and Dumain are blamed for the death, but manage to escape.

The prince Clovis is in love with Aphelia, and she with him; but his elder brother, and now king, Clotair is envious. Castrato helps Clotair plan Aphelia's rape. Clovis intercepts his brother; as they fight, Castrato raises an alarm and their mother Fredigond arrives. Rather than trying to stop the fight, she eggs them on. Clotair stabs Clovis, who is carried off, presumably dead.

Ferdigond and her lover Landrey are in her chamber; Castrato sets the room on fire, but the queen disguises her lover as the ghost of Clovis. Fredigond plans to rule the kingdom with Landrey once Clotair, Clovis, and Aphelia are dead. She wants Clotair to execute Aphelia, to placate Clovis's "ghost." Clotair initially falls for the trick, but Castrato, who is busily manipulating the other characters ("on all sides the eunuch will play foul"), informs him of the queen's intentions. Clotair responds by marrying Aphelia instead of killing her.

Lamot, disguised as a surgeon, has discovered that the wounded Clovis is still alive. Clovis masquerades as the ghost of his father Childerick, and terrifies the queen into admitting that she poisoned her husband. Clovis turns Fredigond and Landrey over to Castrato, who starves the imprisoned queen and her paramour, then poisons them. Landrey tries to escape with a concealed dagger; but in his weakened state he is unable to evade Castrato, who trips him, sits on him, and stabs him.

Castrato has convinced Clotair that Aphelia has been unfaithful to him; Clotair binds his wife and Castrato tortures her (he "sears her breast"). Castrato displays the corpses of Fredigond and Landrey, and Clotair understands that Aphelia is innocent and that he has been abused. Clotair stabs Castrato, who, dying, reveals her true identity as Chrotilda. Lamot and Dumain break into the castle with a party of supporters. The play's conclusion indicates that Clotair, Aphelia, and Chrotilda will die and that Clovis will inherit the throne.
