= Alonso de Olmedo y Ormeño =

Spanish actor, playwright and writer

Alonso de Olmedo y Ormeño (c. 1626–1682) was a Spanish actor, playwright and writer. He was born in Aragon around 1626. He acted mostly in Madrid and formed one of the best theater companies of his time. He became known as one of the greatest actors of the Golden Age.

== Family ==
He was the son of actor and impresario Alonso de Olmedo y Tofino and father of actor and entrepreneur Alonso de Olmedo Escamilla and actor Gaspar de Olmedo. He married the actress María Antonia de León in 1652. She was kidnapped shortly after by the Admiral of Castile. He was then tied to singer Maria de Anaya and had a son with her, Gaspar. He had another child with Manuela Escamilla.

== Death ==
He died in 1682 and had a proper burial with canons at the town hall.
