= Alexander Gough =

17th-century English actor

Alexander Gough (fl. 1626 – 1655), also Goughe or Goffe, was an English actor in the Caroline era. He started out as a boy player filling female roles; during the period of the English Civil War and the Interregnum (1642–1660) when the theatres were closed and actors out of work, Gough became involved in the publication of plays.

Alexander Gough was born in 1614, the son of Robert Gough, an actor with the King's Men. Like some other sons of actors (Theophilus Bird; Robert Pallant), Gough started acting as a boy – in his case, with his father's company. Alexander Gough played:

- Caenis in Massinger's The Roman Actor, 1626
- Acanthe in Massinger's The Picture, 1629
- Eurinia in Wilson's The Swisser, 1631
- Lillia-Bianca in Fletcher's The Wild Goose Chase, the 1632 revival.

Gough also had roles in Ford's The Lover's Melancholy (1628) and Clavell's The Soddered Citizen (1630). Gough remained with the company at least until 1636, and perhaps longer, probably playing minor adult roles.

In 1642, at the start of the Civil War, the Puritan regime forced the closure of the London theatres. Theatrical activity did not cease entirely; rather, actors staged clandestine performances, often at the private houses of sympathetic citizens. In so doing, the actors faced a major and obvious problem: how to find audiences for "secret" performances (ideally, audiences that did not contain informers who would betray them to the authorities). During this period, Alexander Gough reportedly functioned as what was then called a "jackal" – he helped to gather audiences for these clandestine performances.

Later in the Commonwealth era, Gough was active in publication, specifically of plays. He was not the only actor who shifted to publishing; Andrew Pennycuicke and William Cartwright did the same. Most notably, Gough wrote an introduction to Humphrey Moseley's 1652 first edition of The Widow; his preface "To the Reader" re-iterated the title-page attribution of that play to John Fletcher, Ben Jonson, and Thomas Middleton. Modern scholars and critics have strongly rejected the attribution to Fletcher and Jonson, and recognize The Widow as a solo work by Middleton.

Gough was also involved with the first editions of The Queen (1653), a play assigned to John Ford, and Lodowick Carlell's The Passionate Lovers (1655).
