= Nicholas Breton =

Poet and prose writer of the English Renaissance

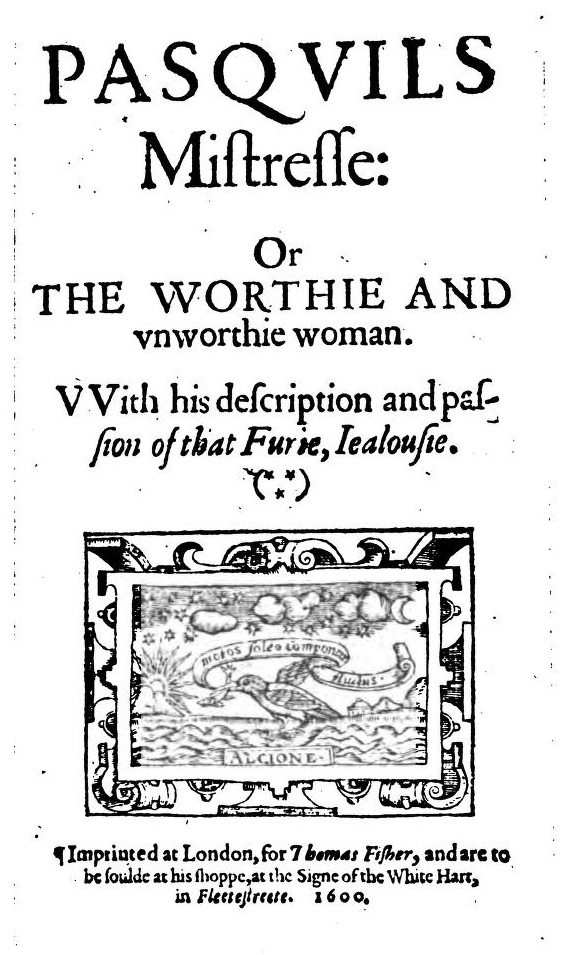
- Born: 1545
- Died: 1626 (aged 80–81)
- Occupations: poet, novelist

Nicholas Breton (also Britton or Brittaine) (c. 1545/53 – c. 1625/6) was a poet and prose writer of the English Renaissance.

== Life ==
Nicholas belonged to an old family settled at Layer Breton, Essex. His father, William Breton, a London merchant who had made a considerable fortune, died in 1559, and his widow Elizabeth (née Bacon) married the poet George Gascoigne before her sons had attained their majority. Nicholas was probably born at the "capitall mansion house" in Red Cross Street, in the parish of St Giles without Cripplegate, mentioned in his father's will.

There is no official record of his residence at the university, but the diary of the Rev. Richard Madox tells us that he was at Antwerp in 1583 and was "once of Oriel College." Breton was paid for carrying letters to The Hague for Francis Walsingham.

He may have been the English poet named "Mr Briton" who visited the court of James VI of Scotland in 1588 or 1589 and received a gift of £160 Scots. Breton's friend, and a compiler of a commonplace book, Stephen Powle, noted that Breton said he had been to Scotland, and was the author of a poem about King James's voyage to Denmark written in the King's voice.

He married Ann Sutton in 1593, and had a family. He is supposed to have died shortly after the publication of his last work, Fantastickes (1626). Breton found a patron in Mary, countess of Pembroke, and wrote much in her honour until 1601, when she seems to have withdrawn her favour. Some of the letters signed N.B. in A Poste with a Packet of Mad Letters (1603, enlarged 1637) may contain autobiographical details; the nineteenth letter of the second part contains a general complaint of many griefs, and proceeds as follows:

Hath another been wounded in the warres, fared hard, lain in a cold bed many a bitter storme, and beene at many a hard banquet? all these have I; another imprisoned? so have I; another long been sicke? so have I; another plagued with an unquiet life? so have I; another indebted to his hearts griefe, and faine would pay and cannot? so am I.

== Works ==
Breton was a prolific author of considerable versatility and gift, and popular with his contemporaries. His work consists of religious and pastoral poems, satires, and a number of miscellaneous prose tracts. His praise of the Virgin and his references to Mary Magdalene have suggested that he was a Roman Catholic, but his prose writings abundantly prove that he was an ardent Anglican.

Breton had little gift for satire, and his best work is to be found in his pastoral poetry. His Passionate Shepheard (1604) is full of sunshine and fresh air, and of unaffected gaiety. The third pastoral in this book—"Who can live in heart so glad / As the merrie country lad"—is well known; with some other of Breton's daintiest poems, among them the lullaby, "Come little babe, come silly soule," (This poem, however, comes from The Arbor of Amorous Devises, which is only in part Breton's work.) —it is incorporated in A. H. Bullen's Lyrics from Elizabethan Romances (1890).

The printed editions of most of Breton's books are very rare and have great bibliographical value. His works, with the exception of some belonging to private owners, were collected by A. B. Grosart in the Chertsey Worthies Library (1879) with an elaborate introduction quoting the documents for the poet's history.

=== Fantasticks ===
Breton's keen observation of country life appears also in his prose idyll, Wits Trenckrnour, "a conference betwixt a scholler and an angler," and in his Fantasticks, a series of short prose pictures of the months, the Christian festivals and the hours, which throw much light on the customs of the times.

In 1942 the American composer Bernard Herrmann set part of Fantasticks as a piece for vocal soloists and orchestra, which he retitled The Fantasticks. He later recorded it much later with the National Philharmonic Orchestra. Herrmann brings the work to a conclusion in May, thereby altering the focus to one celebrating the arrival of spring.

=== Verse ===
Breton's poetical works, the titles of which are here generally somewhat abbreviated, include:

- The Workes of a Young Wit (1577)
- A Floorish upon Fancie (1577)
- Britton's Bowre of Delights (1591)
- The Pilgrimage to Paradise (1592), with a prefatory letter by John Case
- The Arbor of Amorous Devises (entered at Stationers' Hall, 1594), only in part Breton's
- Marie Magdalen's Love: a Solemne Passion of the Soules Love (1595), the first part of which, a prose treatise, is probably by another hand; the second part, a poem in six-lined stanza, is certainly by Breton
- The Countess of Penbrook's Passion (manuscript), first printed by JO Halliwell-Phillipps in 1853
- Pasquils Fooles-cap (1600)
- Pasquil's Mistresse (1600)
- Pasquil's Passe and Passeth Not (1600)
- Melancholike Humours (1600) – reprinted by Scholartis Press London. 1929.
- Contributions to England's Helicon (1600) and other verse miscellanies.
- A Divine Poem, including "The Ravisht Soul" and "The Blessed Weeper" (1601)
- An Excellent Poem, upon the Longing of a Blessed heart (1601)
- The Soules Heavenly Exercise (1601)
- The Soules Harmony (1602)
- Olde Madcappe newe Gaily mawfrey (1602)
- The Mother's Blessing (1602)
- A True Description of Unthankfulnesse (1602)
- The Passionate Shepheard, or The shepheardes love, set down in passions to his shepheardess Aglaia. With many excellent conceited poems and pleasant sonnets, fit for young heads to passe away (1604)
- The Souies Immortail Crowne (1605)
- The Honour of Valour (1605)
- An Invective against Treason; I would and I would not (1614)

=== Prose ===
- Auspicante Jehoua
- Wit's Trenchmour (1597)
- The Wil of Wit (1599)
- Strange Fortunes of Two Excellent Princes
- Crossing of Proverbs
- Figure of Foure
- Wonders Worth Hearing
- A Poste with a Packet of Mad Letters (1602–6)
- A Dialogue of Pithe
- Grimello's Fortunes (1603)
- [A Mad World My Masters, Mistake Me Not; Or] A Merrie Dialogue Betwixt the Taker and Mistaker (1603)
- Olde Man's Lesson
- I Pray You be Not Angrie
- A Murmurer
- Divine Considerations
- Wit's Private Wealth
- Characters upon Essaies
- Good and Bad
- Strange News out of Divers Countries (1622)
- Fantasticks
- Courtier and Countryman
- Character of Queen Elizabeth
- Mary Magdalen's Lamentations (1604) and The Passion of a Discontented Mind (1601) are sometimes erroneously ascribed to Breton
- Sir Philip Sidney's Ourania by N. B. (1606)
