= John Webster =

English playwright (c. 1580 – c. 1632)

- Born: c. 1578; London, England
- Died: c. 1626 (age 53 or 54); London, England
- Spouse: Sara Peniall

John Webster (c. 1578 – c. 1632) was an English Jacobean dramatist best known for his tragedies The White Devil and The Duchess of Malfi, which are often seen as masterpieces of the early 17th-century English stage. His life and career overlapped with Shakespeare's.

== Biography ==
Webster's life is obscure and the dates of his birth and death are not known. His father, a carriage maker also named John Webster, married a blacksmith's daughter named Elizabeth Coates on 4 November 1577 and it is likely that Webster was born not long after, in or near London. The family lived in St Sepulchre's parish. His father John and uncle Edward were Freemen of the Merchant Taylors' Company and Webster attended Merchant Taylors' School in Suffolk Lane, London. On 1 August 1598, "John Webster, lately of the New Inn" was admitted to the Middle Temple, one of the Inns of Court; in view of the legal interests evident in his dramatic work, this may be the playwright. Webster married 17-year-old Sara Peniall on 18 March 1605 at St Mary's Church, Islington. A special licence was needed to permit a wedding in Lent, as Sara was seven months pregnant. Their first child, John Webster III, was baptised at the parish of St Dunstan-in-the-West on 8 March 1606. Bequests in the will of a neighbour who died in 1617, indicate that other children were born to him.

Most of what is otherwise known of him relates to his theatrical activities. Webster was still writing plays in the mid-1620s, but Thomas Heywood's Hierarchie of the Blessed Angels (licensed 7 November 1634) speaks of him in the past tense, implying he was then dead.

There is no known portrait of Webster.

=== Early collaboration ===
By 1602, Webster was working with teams of playwrights on history plays, most of which were never printed. They included a tragedy, Caesar's Fall (written with Michael Drayton, Thomas Dekker, Thomas Middleton and Anthony Munday), and a collaboration with Dekker, Christmas Comes but Once a Year (1602). With Dekker he also wrote Sir Thomas Wyatt, which was printed in 1607 and had probably been first performed in 1602. He worked with Dekker again on two city comedies, Westward Ho in 1604 and Northward Ho in 1605. Also in 1604, he adapted John Marston's The Malcontent for staging by the King's Men.

=== The major tragedies ===
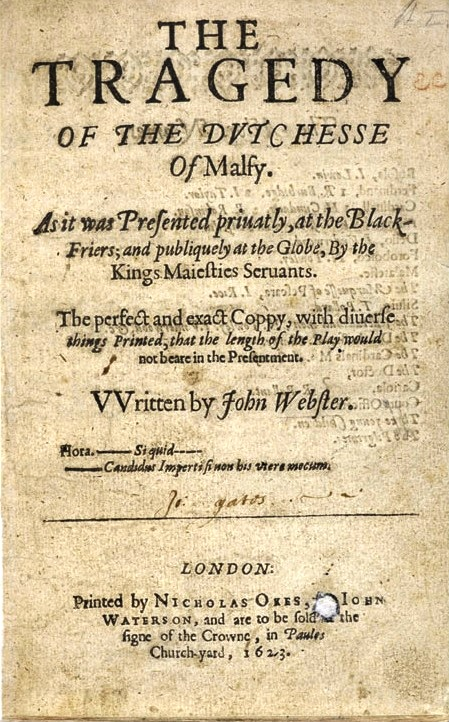
Title page of The Duchess of Malfi, 1623

Despite his ability to write comedy, Webster is best known for two brooding English tragedies based on Italian sources. The White Devil, a retelling of the intrigues involving Vittoria Accoramboni, an Italian woman assassinated at the age of 28, was a failure when staged at the Red Bull Theatre in 1612 (published the same year) being too unusual and intellectual for its audience. The Duchess of Malfi, first performed by the King's Men about 1614 and published nine years later, was more successful. He also wrote a play called Guise, based on French history, of which little else is known, as no text has survived.

The White Devil was performed in the Red Bull Theatre, an open-air theatre that is believed to have specialised in providing simple, escapist drama for a largely working-class audience, a factor that might explain why Webster's intellectual and complex play was unpopular with its audience. In contrast, The Duchess of Malfi was probably performed by the King's Men in the smaller, indoor Blackfriars Theatre, where it might have been appreciated by a better educated audience. The two plays would thus have been played very differently: The White Devil by adult actors, probably in continuous action, with elaborate stage effects a possibility, and The Duchess of Malfi in a controlled environment, with artificial lighting and musical interludes between acts, which allowed time, perhaps, for the audience to accept the otherwise strange rapidity with which the Duchess could have babies.

=== Late plays ===
Webster wrote one more play on his own: The Devil's Law Case (c. 1617–1619), a tragicomedy. His later plays were collaborative city comedies: Anything for a Quiet Life (c. 1621) co-written with Thomas Middleton and A Cure for a Cuckold (c. 1624) co-written with William Rowley. In 1624, he also co-wrote a topical play about a recent scandal, Keep the Widow Waking (with John Ford, Rowley and Dekker). The play is lost, but its plot is known from a court case. He is believed to have contributed to the tragicomedy The Fair Maid of the Inn with John Fletcher, Ford and Phillip Massinger. His Appius and Virginia, probably written with Thomas Heywood, is of uncertain date.

== Plays ==
- Westward Ho (1603–04) (co-written with Thomas Dekker)
- Northward Ho (1605) (co-written with Dekker)
- Sir Thomas Wyatt (1607) (co-written with Dekker)
- The White Devil (1612)
- The Duchess of Malfi (1612–13)
- The Devil's Law Case (1616–1620)
- Anything for a Quiet Life (1621) (co-written with Thomas Middleton)
- A Cure for a Cuckold (1624–25) (co-written with William Rowley)
- The Fair Maid of the Inn (1625–26) (co-written with John Fletcher and Philip Massinger)
- Appius and Virginia (1625–1627) (co-written with Thomas Heywood)

== Reputation ==
Webster's intricate, complex, subtle and learned plays are difficult, but rewarding and are still frequently staged. Webster has gained a reputation as the Elizabethan and Jacobean dramatist with the most unsparingly dark vision of human nature. Even more than John Ford, whose 'Tis Pity She's a Whore is also bleak, Webster's tragedies present a horrific vision of humanity. T. S. Eliot wrote in his poem “Whispers of Immortality” that Webster always saw "the skull beneath the skin".

Webster's title character in The Duchess of Malfi is presented as a figure of virtue compared with her malevolent brothers. She faces death with classic Stoic courage in a martyr-like scene which has been compared to that of the king in Christopher Marlowe's play Edward II. Webster's use of a strong, virtuous woman as his main character was very rare for his time and marks a deliberate reworking of some of the original historical events on which the play was based. The character of the Duchess recalls the Victorian poet and essayist Algernon Charles Swinburne's comment in A Study of Shakespeare that in tragedies such as King Lear Shakespeare had shown such a bleak world as a foil or backdrop for virtuous heroines such as Ophelia and Imogen, so that their characterisation would not seem too incredible. Swinburne describes such heroines as shining in the darkness.

Webster's drama was generally dismissed in the 18th and 19th centuries, but many 20th-century critics and theatregoers have found The White Devil and The Duchess of Malfi brilliant plays of great poetic quality. One explanation for the change of view is that the horrors of war in the early 20th century had led to desperate protagonists being on stage again and understood. W. A. Edwards wrote of Webster's plays in Scrutiny II (1933–1934): "Events are not within control, nor are our human desires; let's snatch what comes and clutch it, fight our way out of tight corners, and meet the end without squealing." The violence and pessimism of the tragedies have seemed to some analysts close to modern sensibilities.

== Webster in other works ==
- The 18th-century play The Fatal Secret by Lewis Theobald is a reworking of The Duchess of Malfi, imposing Aristotle's 'unities' and a happy ending on the plot.
- The short story 'A Christmas in Padua' in F. L. Lucas's The Woman Clothed with the Sun (1937) retells the final hours in December 1585 of Vittoria Accoramboni (the original of Webster's White Devil), slanting the narrative from her perspective.
- The 1982 detective novel The Skull Beneath the Skin by P. D. James centres on an ageing actress who plans to play Webster's drama The Duchess of Malfi in a Victorian castle theatre. The novel takes its title from T. S. Eliot's famous characterisation of Webster's work in his poem 'Whispers of Immortality'.
- Webster, a play by Robert David McDonald, was written for and premièred at the Glasgow Citizens Theatre, 1984.
- A young John Webster, played by Joe Roberts, appears in the 1998 film Shakespeare in Love. When talking to Will Shakespeare he tells him, "When I write plays they'll be like Titus... plenty of blood – that's the only writing." The scene alludes to the real John Webster's macabre work. He is also the character who reveals Viola's disguise, after watching Viola and Shakespeare making love in the theatre.
- A fragment of Act Four, Scene Two, of The Duchess of Malfi is shown in the 1987 BBC TV film version of Agatha Christie's detective novel Sleeping Murder. Webster's line, "Cover her face; mine eyes dazzle: she died young", is used in Christie's novel, and also in the novel Queen of the Damned by Anne Rice.
- Mike Figgis's 2001 film Hotel involves scenes from The Duchess of Malfi.
- The antagonist in Paul Johnston's 'The Death List' and 'The Soul Collector' mimics The White Devil in character-names and actions.
- In Episode 11, Season 2 of HBO's Boardwalk Empire, The White Devil is discussed in a Princeton classroom during a scene that takes place in Jimmy Darmody's past. At the end of the scene the teacher quotes the line "What, because we are poor shall we be vicious?" to which Jimmy responds "Pray what means have you to keep me from the galleys, or the gallows?" Later in the episode, the teacher refers to Jimmy's life as Jacobean.
- Webster and his works The White Devil and The Duchess of Malfi are mentioned in the lyrics to the song My White Devil by Echo & The Bunnymen, included on their 1983 album Porcupine.
- A London production of The White Devil with Gemma Arterton in the lead role takes place in the movie The Critic (2023), including a portentous delivery of the couplet, "Let guilty men remember their black deeds/Do lean on crutches, made of slender reeds."
