= Richard Hubberthorne =

Quaker preacher and writer

Richard Hubberthorne (1628 (baptized) – 17 August 1662) was an early Quaker preacher and writer active in the 1650s and early 1660s until his death in Newgate prison.

Hubberthorne is generally overshadowed by more famous early Quakers like George Fox, James Nayler, and Edward Burrough. William Braithwaite Beginnings of Quakerism includes him among the "heroic pioneers of the new movement", but puts him last, and later describes his writing as having "no distinction either of style or matter".

== Pre-Quaker life ==
Hubberthorne was born in Lancashire, the only son of a yeoman and his wife. His childhood is reminiscent of Fox's – Edward Burrough describes him as being "inclinable from his youth upwards to Religion and to the best way, always minding the best things", though unlike the headstrong young George, his disposition was "meek and lowly", and he "loved peace among men". However, around age 20 he joined the army and fought in the English Civil War, which Burrough reports without obvious disapproval.

After the war ended, he apparently was in the company of the large group of disaffected radical puritans known as "Seekers" in the Westmorland area. The Seekers were already close to a number of "Quaker" positions and practices: their official minister refused to accept payment from the compulsory tithes, for example, and after he left the group held some of their meetings in silence.

== Quaker career ==
But the spark that lit a fire under the Westmorland Seekers was the arrival of George Fox in June 1652. Burrough, who was also one of them, recounts Hubberthorne's conversion experience in this way:

And when it pleased the Lord God everlasting to raise us up to be a People in the North parts, ... This same Person was one among the first of us whose heart the Lord touched with the sense of his Power and Kingdom; and amongst us he had the mighty operation of the Power of God experienced in his heart; Great afflictions and tribulations for many weeks was he exercised in ... he was in that state, and while therein exercised for many days, a wonder to all that beheld him, as one passing out of the body, as one under the deep sense of the hand of the Lord, under the operation of his Power; thus it was with many of us, and particularly with him...

== Works ==
A volume of his collected works were published in 1663, a year after his death, and titled A collection of the several books and writings of that faithful servant of God, Richard Hubberthorn, who finished his testimony (being a prisoner at Newgate for the truths sake) the 17th of the 6th month, 1662.

Not everything he wrote appears to be included in this volume however, because another recent book (Walking in the way of peace by Meredith Baldwin Weddle) refers to a pamphlet of his called The good old cause briefly demonstrated, published in 1659 that is not in the Collection.

== Literature ==
- Claus Bernet (2010). "Richard Hubberthorne". In Bautz, Traugott (ed.). Biographisch-Bibliographisches Kirchenlexikon (BBKL) (in German). Vol. 31. Nordhausen: Bautz. cols. 669–677. ISBN 978-3-88309-544-8.
