= The Fair Maid of the Inn =

Play

The Fair Maid of the Inn is an early 17th-century stage play. A comedy in the canon of John Fletcher and his collaborators, it was originally published in the first Beaumont and Fletcher folio of 1647. Uncertainties of the play's date, authorship, and sources make it one of the most widely disputed works in English Renaissance drama.

== Date ==
The Fair Maid of the Inn was licensed for performance by Sir Henry Herbert, the Master of the Revels, on 22 January 1626 (new style). In his records, Herbert specifically attributes the play to Fletcher, who had died in August 1625. The play is thought to have been acted by the King's Men, the company Fletcher served as house playwright—though firm data on its performance history are lacking. It was first printed in 1647.

== Authorship ==
Inconsistencies in the play's internal evidence, notably the lack of Fletcher's highly distinctive pattern of textual preferences (ye for you, 'em for them, etc.) through much of the play, made early scholars realize that the play was, like the majority of the works in Fletcher's canon, a collaboration. Individual critics argued in favor of a range of potential collaborators, including Philip Massinger, John Ford, John Webster, and William Rowley. These arguments depend upon literary parallels and the distinctive textual preferences of the different authors; for example, Ford's pattern of unusual contractional forms (like t'ee for to ye,) is present in some scenes but absent from others.

The play appears to have been a late work by Fletcher, perhaps left unfinished at his death, that was later completed by others and perhaps revised during the two decades between 1625 and 1647. Cyrus Hoy, in his sweeping evaluation of authorship questions in Fletcher's canon, argued that the hands of Massinger, Fletcher, Ford, and Webster are all detectable in the extant text. He assigned shares this way:

Massinger – Act I; Act V, scene 3a (to Host's entrance);
Webster – Act II; Act IV, 2; Act V, 1, 2, and 3b (from Host's entrance);
Ford – Act III;
Fletcher and Ford – Act IV, 1.

Other scholars prefer their own divisions and analyses.

The possibility of revision has effected the question of the play's genre; some critics would define it as a tragicomedy. One scholar, Bertha Hensman, argued that an original comedy by Fletcher and Rowley was shifted into a tragicomic form by Massinger as reviser.

== Sources ==
The play's plot derives from the historical feud of the Bianchi and Neri factions in late medieval Florence. The white (Bianchi) and black (Neri) Guelph factions were in part family-based—respectively, the Cerchi family and the Donati. The disputed origins of the factions were by some accounts rooted in the rivalry of two lovers of Bianca Cancellieri; her name suggested the Biancha in this play. The factions are most famous for their role in the life of Dante Alighieri; when the Neri took power in Florence in 1301, Bianchi like Dante were exiled.

Some critics believed that the source for the play was The Illustrious Handmaid (La ilustre fregona) by Miguel de Cervantes; others, however, have argued that the playwright(s) could have accessed the same historical material in other sources. Other possible sources include the Florentine History (Istorie fiorentine) by Niccolò Machiavelli and the Excerpta Controversarium of Seneca the Elder.

== Synopsis ==
The plot of the play concerns the intertwined fortunes of two prominent Florentine families. Alberto is the Admiral of Florence; he is married to Mariana; their children are Cesario and Clarissa. Baptista, another old sailor, is a friend of Alberto, and father of Mentivole; like their fathers, Cesario and Mentivole are friends. Alberto's is a stable nuclear family; Mariana is a doting mother, especially in regard to Cesario. Baptista's situation is less happy: fourteen years earlier, he, a widower in his prime, contracted a secret marriage with Juliana, a niece of the Duke of Genoa. After a short three months of contentment, the Genoese duke discovered the marriage, exiled Baptista, and sequestered Juliana. He has not seen her since.

This situation is delineated in the play's long opening scene. At the scene's opening, Cesario warns Clarissa to safeguard her virginity and her reputation; but Clarissa responds by reproving her brother about his rumored affair with Biancha, the thirteen-year-old daughter of a local tavernkeeper (she's the "fair maid" of the title). Cesario protests that his connection with the girl is above reproach: Biancha, he says, is beautiful but chaste. By the scene's close, Mentivole expresses his love for Clarissa; she responds positively, and gives him a diamond ring as a token of her affection and commitment.

Friends though they are, Cesario and Mentivole have a falling-out over a horse race; they quarrel, lose their tempers, and draw their swords to fight. They are separated by other friends, but only after Cesario is wounded. The affair escalates into a major feud between the two families. Alberto is called away by his naval duties, and is soon reported dead. Mariana fears that her son will be killed in the feud; to prevent this, she announces (falsely) to the Duke and his court that Cesario is not really Alberto's son. Early in their marriage, she maintains, Alberto had wanted an heir, but the couple did not conceive. Mariana exploited her husband's absences at sea to pass off a servant's child as her own. Thus he is no longer Alberto's son, and safe from Baptista's enmity. But the Duke sees the injustice done against Cesario, and decrees that the now-widowed Mariana should marry the young man, and endow him with three-quarters of Alberto's estate; the remaining share will serve as Clarissa's dowry.

Cesario is amenable to this arrangement—but Mariana assures him that any marriage between them will never be consummated. Cesario proposes a marriage between himself and Clarissa, though both women reject the idea out of hand. And even Biancha turns against Cesario, when she comes to understand that he is not serious about marrying her. Eventually matters are set right when Alberto returns to Florence. Not dead, he was instead captured by the Turks, but rescued by Prospero, a captain in the service of Malta. Prospero is an old friend of both Alberto and Baptista; he is able to inform the world of the fate of Juliana, and the daughter that Alberto didn't know Baptista had. She is Biancha, the supposed daughter of the tavernkeeper. This good news allows the compounding of all the previous difficulties; the quarrel between Alberto and Baptista is resolved, Cesario is restored to his rightful place as Alberto's son, and he and Biancha can marry, as can Mentivole and Clarissa.

The play has a comic subplot centered on Biancha, her supposed parents the Host and Hostess of the tavern, and their quests. The comedy features a mountebank and his clownish assistant, and their victims.

The play's storytelling is rough and rather inconsistent, most likely due to the multiple hands involved in its authorship.

(A poem by Jonathan Swift titled "Molly Mog" in subtitled "The Fair Maid of the Inn".)
