= List of Epistolae (Letters) of Spinoza =

The following is a list of notable correspondence (Epistolae) of the Dutch philosopher Benedictus de Spinoza (1633-1677) with well-known learned men and with his admirers. These letters were published after Spinoza's death in the Opera Posthuma (Dutch translated edition: De nagelate schriften, 1677). Spinoza had preserved the incoming letters and drafts of the letters he sent. In total 88 letters, predominantly concerning philosophical subjects have been handed down: 50 by Spinoza and 38 by his correspondents, 52 written in Latin and 26 in Dutch. The letters discuss topics from Spinoza's own work including infinity and the attributes (properties) of "God", Spinoza's concept of the universe) but also touch on subjects such as ghosts and scientific discoveries, for example the vacuum.

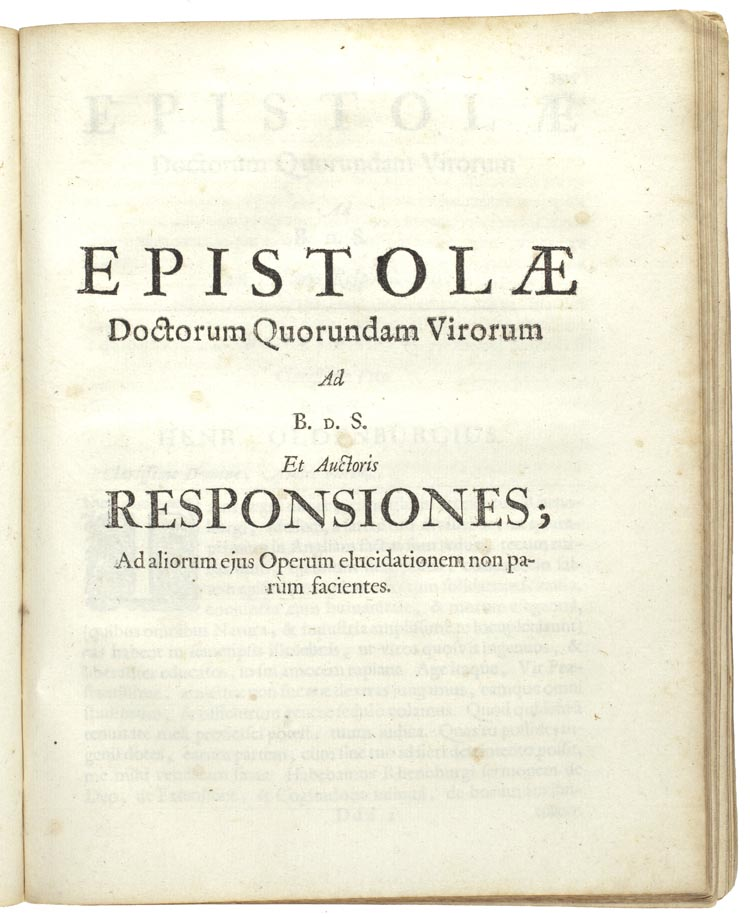
Title page of B.d.S.: Epistolae doctorum quorumdam virorum, 1677, in Latin and Dutch. Translated title: Letters of learned men with answers. Published posthumously.

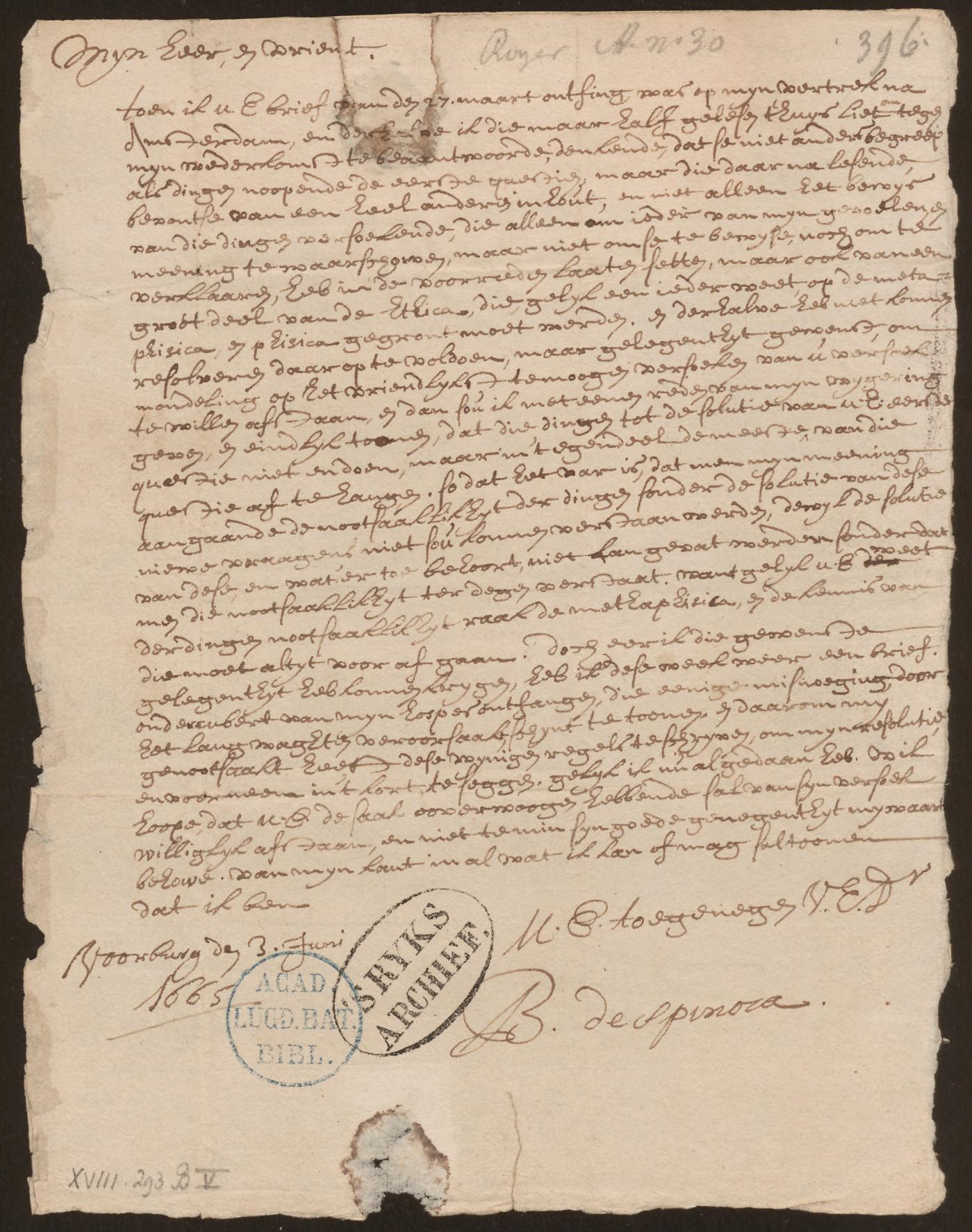
Letter of Benedictus de Spinoza (Gebhardt number 27) to Willem van Blijenbergh, written at Voorburg on 3 June 1665. In Dutch.

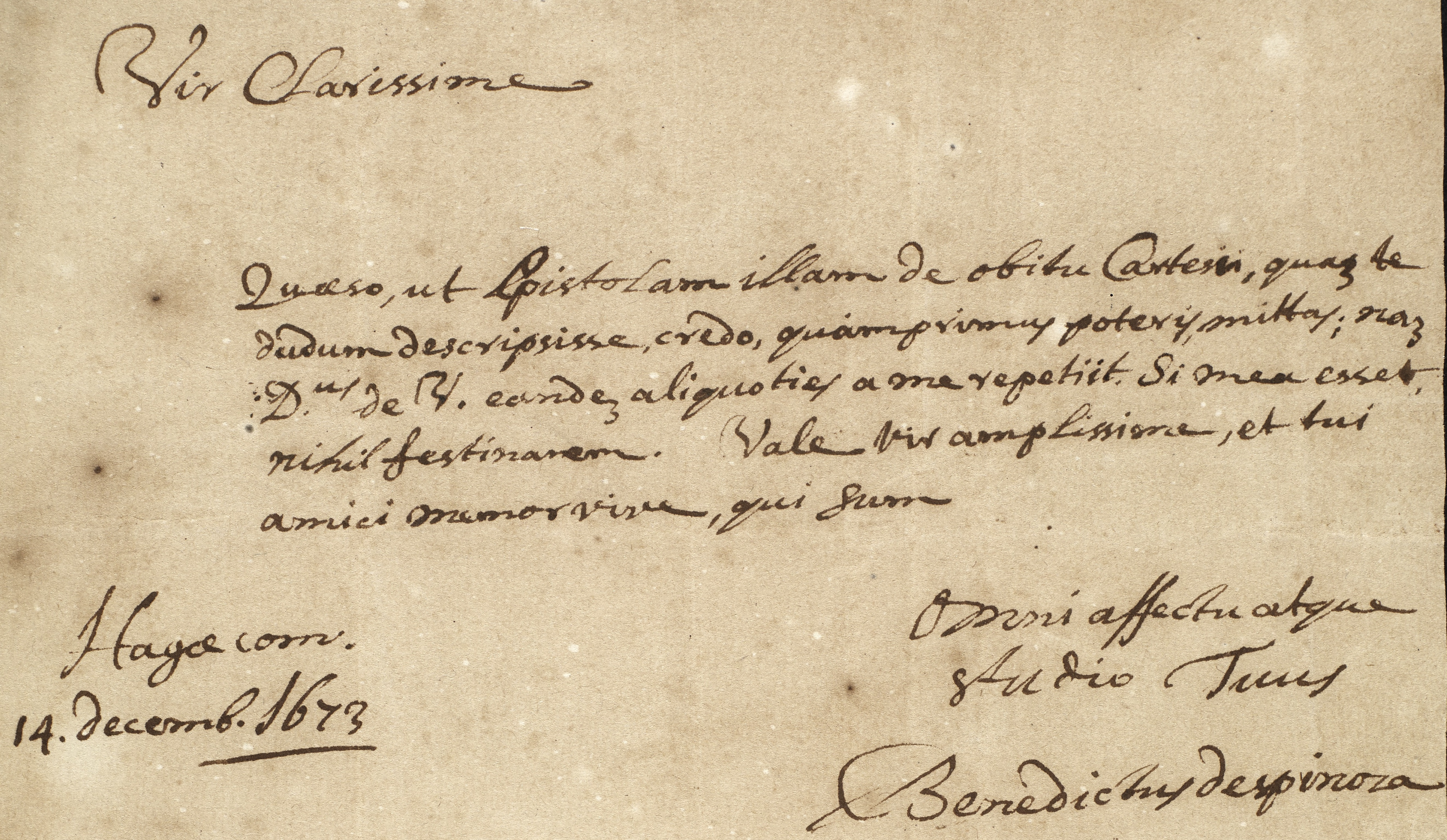
Short letter (Gebhardt number 49) of Spinoza to the Utrecht professor Johannes Georgius Graevius of 14 December 1664. In Latin. .

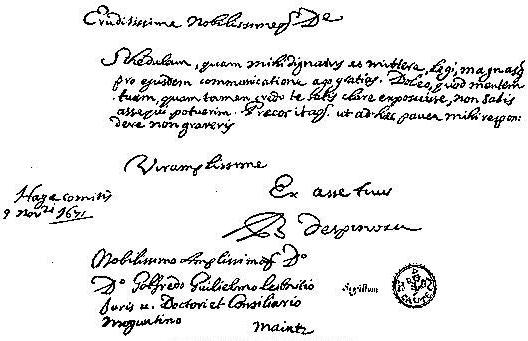
Short letter (Gebhardt number 46) of Spinoza to Leibniz of 9 November 1671. In Latin.

== Table of selected letters ==
The date of the letter is given with a correction for the Old/New Style dating system. A selection from the letters:

Number	Gebhardt number	From Sender	To Addressee	Location Sender	Day	Month	Year	Subject	Language
01 I	01 I	Oldenburg, Henry	Spinoza, Benedictus de	London	16/26	08	1661	God, extension	Latin
02 II	02 II	Spinoza	Oldenburg			09	1661	Attributes (properties) of God, Ethica part 1 axioms, theorem 1–4, mistakes by Descartes and Francis Bacon (1561-1626).	Latin
03 III	03 III	Oldenburg	Spinoza	London	27	09	1661	Existence of God, Ethica part 1 axioms, promises to send a book by Robert Boyle.	Latin
04 IV	04 IV	Spinoza	Oldenburg			10	1661	Short answers to questions, Spinoza will visit Amsterdam.	Latin
05 V	05 V	Oldenburg	Spinoza	London	11/21	10	1661	Sends Robert Boyle's book: De Nitro, Fluiditate, & Firmitate.	Latin
06 VI	06 VI	Spinoza	Oldenburg				1661?	Thanks for and comments on Robert Boyle's book De Nitro, Fluiditate, & Firmitate, with sketches.	Latin
07 VII	07 VII	Oldenburg	Spinoza					Boyle thanks Spinoza through Oldenburg for his comments. B. lacked the time to answer Spinoza himself and had to defend himself against attacks on his books about the pressure and expansion of gases. The Royal Society has been founded. Oldenburg exhorts Spinoza to publish in his own free Dutch Republic (Republic of the Seven United Netherlands).	Latin
08 VIII	11 XI	Oldenburg	Spinoza	London	03	04	1663	Answer to letter 6?	Latin
15 XV	32 XXXII	Spinoza	Oldenburg			11	1665	Coherence of nature, Christiaan Huygens	Latin
23 XXIII	36 XXXVI	Spinoza	Blijenbergh	Voorburg	13	03	1665	"Mijnheer en Vrient", "U. E. V. E. D."	Dutch
24 XXIV	37 XXXVII	Blijenbergh	Spinoza	Dordrecht	27	03	1665	Answer to 23, "Mijn heer en vrient", "UEDWD"	Dutch
26 XXVI	08 VIII	Vries, Simon Joosten de	Spinoza	Amsterdam	24	02	1664	Discusses Spinoza's work with a group of people. Asks two questions about nature in the Ethica and the opinion of others. Mentions Casearius, Borelli, Tacquet and Clavius. Questions Ethica part 1 theorem 8 remark 3 and theorem 19 remark 2.	Latin
27 XXVII	09 IX	Spinoza	Vries, de				1663	Spinoza sorts out various kinds of definitions and explains his opinions.	Latin
28 XXVIII	10 X	Spinoza	Vries, de	Rijnsburg			1663?	Answer on proofs and eternity.	Latin
29 XXIX	12 XII	Spinoza	Meijer, Lodewijk		20	04	1663	Infinity	Latin
31 XXXI	18 XVIII	Blijenbergh, Willem van	Spinoza	Dordrecht	12	12	1664	Opening: "Mijn Heer en onbekende Vrient..."	Dutch
32 XXXII	19 XIX	Spinoza	Blijenbergh	"Op de Lange bogart"	05	01	1665		Dutch
33 XXXIII	20 XX	Blijenbergh	Spinoza	Dordrecht	16	01	1665	Opening: "Mijn Heer en waarde Vrient"	Dutch
34 XXXIV	21 XXI	Spinoza	Blijenbergh	-	-	-	1665		Latin (no Dutch?)
35 XXXV	22 XXII	Blijenbergh	Spinoza	"Dordrecht by de groote kerck"	19	02	1665		Dutch
36 XXXVI	23 XXIII	Spinoza	Blijenbergh	Voorburg	13	03	1665		Dutch
37 XXXVII	24 XXIV	Blijenbergh	Spinoza	Dordrecht	27	03	1665		Dutch
38 XXXVIII	27 XXVII	Spinoza	Blijenbergh	Voorburg	03	06	1665		Dutch
39 XXXIX	34 XXXIV	Spinoza	Hudde, Johannes	Voorburg	07	01	1666	God	Latin
40 XL	35 XXXV	Spinoza	Hudde	Voorburg	10	04	1666	God	Latin
41 XLI	36 XXXVI	Spinoza	Hudde?			05	1666	God	Latin
42 XLII	37 XXXVII	Spinoza	Bouwmeester?, I. B.		10	06	1666	The best method to acquire knowledge.	Latin
45 XLV	51 LI	Leibniz	Spinoza "à Amsterdam"	Frankfurt	05 NS	10	1671		Latin, "Illustris et Amplme Vir"
46 XLVI	52 LII	Spinoza	Leibniz	Den Haag	09	11	1671	Answer to letter Gebhardt number 45, in two versions, "Afgegaan den 8ste December 1671"	Latin, "Nobilissime Vir"
49 XLIX	-	Spinoza	Graevius, Johannes Georgius at Utrecht	Den Haag	16	12	1673	"(Hagse nacht post.)"	Latin, "Vir Clarissime", "Omni affectu atque studio Tuus", "Benedictus despinoza"
50 L	50 L	Spinoza	Jelles, Jarig?		02	06	1674	Difference between Thomas Hobbes and Spinoza on politics and God.	Latin
51 LI	45 XLV	Leibniz	Spinoza	Frankfurt	05 styl	10	1671		Latin
52 LII	46 XLVI	Spinoza	Leibniz	Den Haag/The Hague	09	11	1671		Latin
61 LXI	57 LVII	Ehrenfried Walther von Tschirnhaus?	Spinoza		08	10	1674	Difference between Descartes and Spinoza on free will.	Latin
62 LXII	58 LVIII	Spinoza	Schuller?			10	1674	Freedom	Latin
63 LXIII	59 LIX	Tschirnhaus	Spinoza		05	01	1675	Calls on Spinoza to publish his books Tractatus de Intellectus Emendatione (Treatise on the Emendation of the Intellect) and Ethica, the definition of motion and the difference between true and adequate ideas.	Latin
64 LXIV	60 LX	Spinoza	Tschirnhaus?			01	1675	Difference between true and adequate ideas.	Latin
65 LXV	63 LXIII	Schuller?	Spinoza		25	07	1675	Four questions on the attributes (properties) of God.	Latin
66 LXVI	64 LXIV	Spinoza	Schuller?		29	07	1675	Gives answers concerning the first three applauded books of the Ethica, that should be handed to a friend.	Latin
67 LXVII	65 LXV	Tschirnhaus?	Spinoza		12	08	1675	Inquires whether there exist two or more attributes (properties) of God, except extension (mass) and thought.	Latin
68 LXVIII	66 LXVI	Spinoza	Tschirnhaus?		18	08	1675	Refers to Ethica part 1 theorem 10 and Ethica part 2 theorem 7 Scholium [remark].	Latin
69 LXIX	80 LXXX	Tschirnhaus?	Spinoza		02	05	1676	Asks Spinoza to explain his letters on infinity (Letter 29).	Latin
70 LXX	81 LXXXI	Spinoza	Tschirnhaus?		05	05	1676	Explains his position on infinity.	Latin
71 LXXI	82 LXXXII	Tschirnhaus?	Spinoza		23	06	1676	Asks how Spinoza derives the existence of various bodies from extension.	Latin
72 LXXII	83 LXXXII	Spinoza	Tschirnhaus?		15	07	1676	Replies that this is impossible, and that this is not his doctrine.	Latin
no number	84 LXXXIV	Spinoza	A friend?	-	-	-	-	About Spinoza's Tractatus politicus.	Latin
