= Epistolae (Spinoza) =

Letters to and from the Dutch philosopher Benedictus de Spinoza (1633–1677)

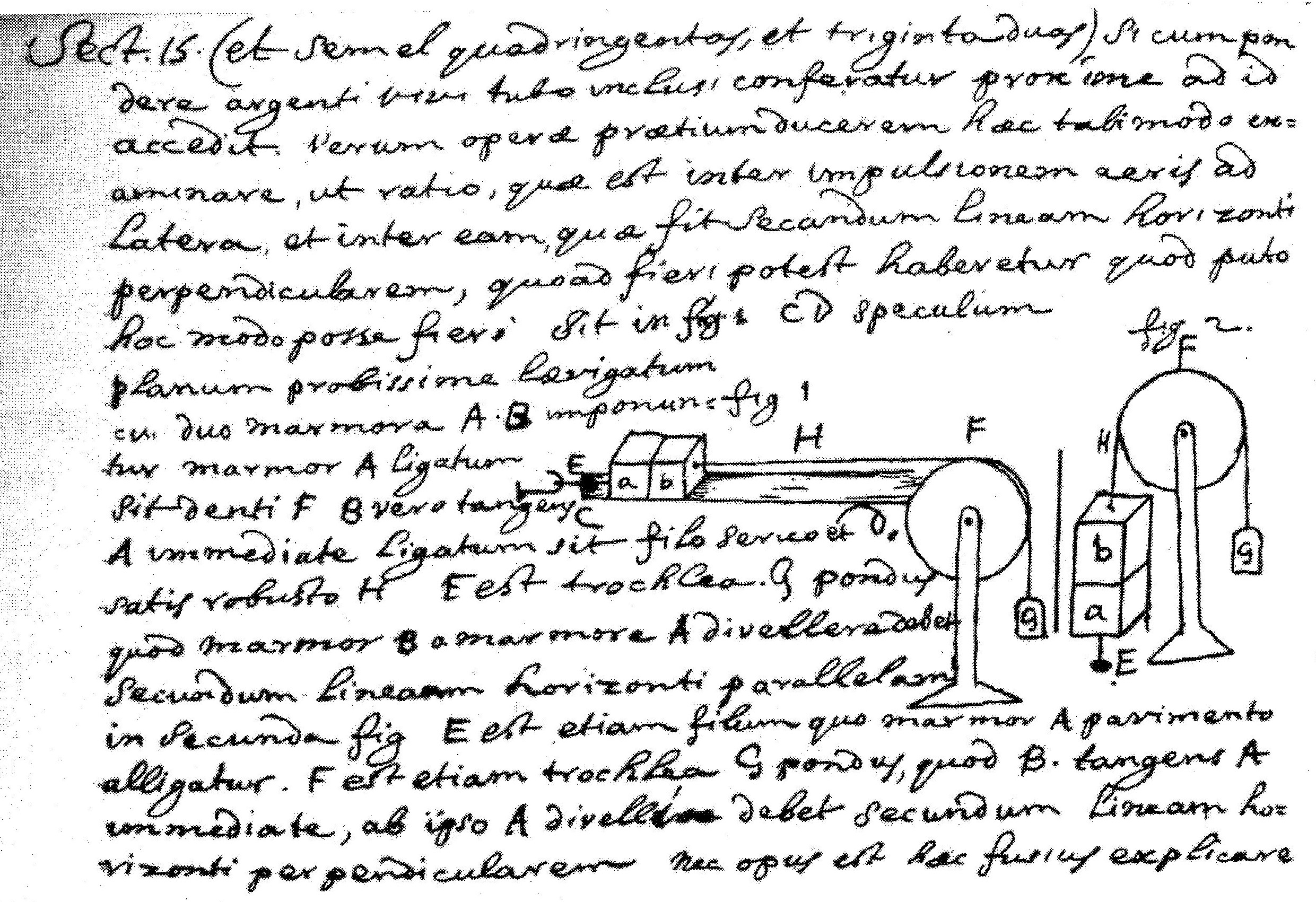
Part of a letter by Benedictus de Spinoza to Henry Oldenburg with a discussion of a mechanical experiment by Descartes, Letter 6 in Gebhardt's numbering, end of 1661. In Latin.

The Epistolae are the correspondence of the Dutch philosopher Benedictus de Spinoza with a number of well-known learned men and with Spinoza's admirers, which Spinoza's followers in Amsterdam published after his death in the Opera Posthuma (Dutch translated edition: De nagelate schriften, 1677).

Spinoza preserved the letters he received as well as the rough drafts of the letters he sent; 88 letters about mostly philosophical subjects have been preserved: 50 by Spinoza and 38 by his correspondents, 52 written in Latin and 26 in Dutch. The letters concern subjects from the works by Spinoza (for instance infinity and the attributes (properties) of "God", Spinoza's concept of the universe) but also about ghosts and scientific discoveries as the vacuum.

== Quote on friendship ==
(Benedictus de Spinoza's text in Dutch:) Want voor my van al die dingen, die buyten myn maght syn, geen grooter aght als de eer te moogen hebben, van met luyde, die de waarhyt opreghtlyk beminnen, in verbont van vrientschap te treede, om dat ik geloof, dat wy niets ter werelt, dat buyten onse maght is, gerustigh konnen beminnen, dan sodanige menschen...
(Benedictus de Spinoza, Letter to Willem van Blijenbergh, 5 January 1665, Op de lange bogart, Schiedam.)

Translation:

(Translation) Because to me of all the things that are beyond my power, none is greater than to have the honour to enter into an alliance of friendship with people who love truth sincerely because I believe that we can love nothing beyond our power in the world more safely than such people...

== Correspondents ==
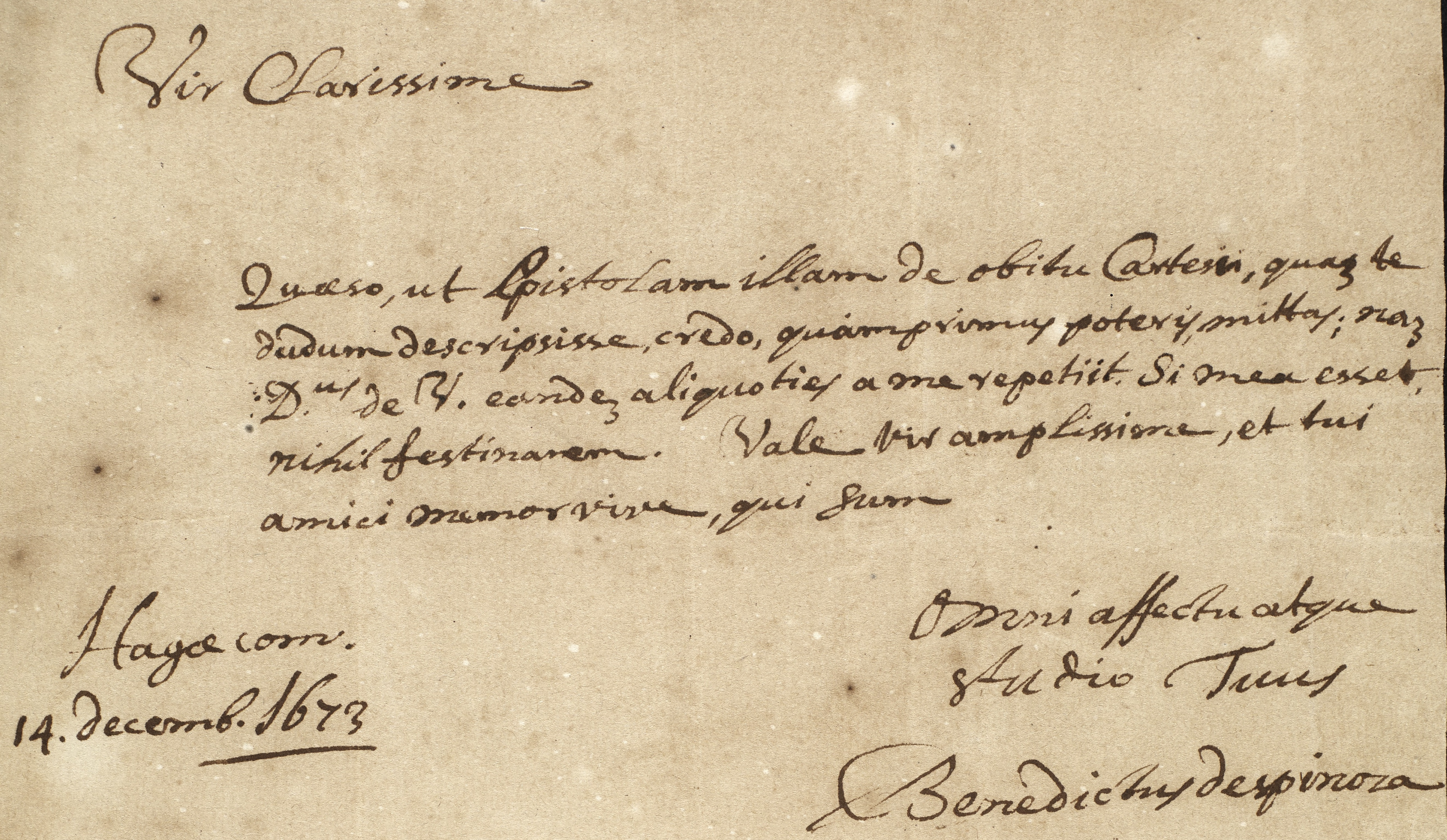
Short letter to the Utrecht professor Johannes Georgius Graevius, 14 December 1664. In Latin. Gebhardt letter number 49.

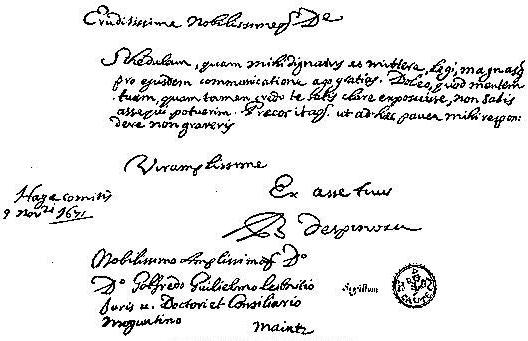
Short letter of Spinoza to Leibniz, 9 November 1671. In Latin. Gebhardt letter number 46.

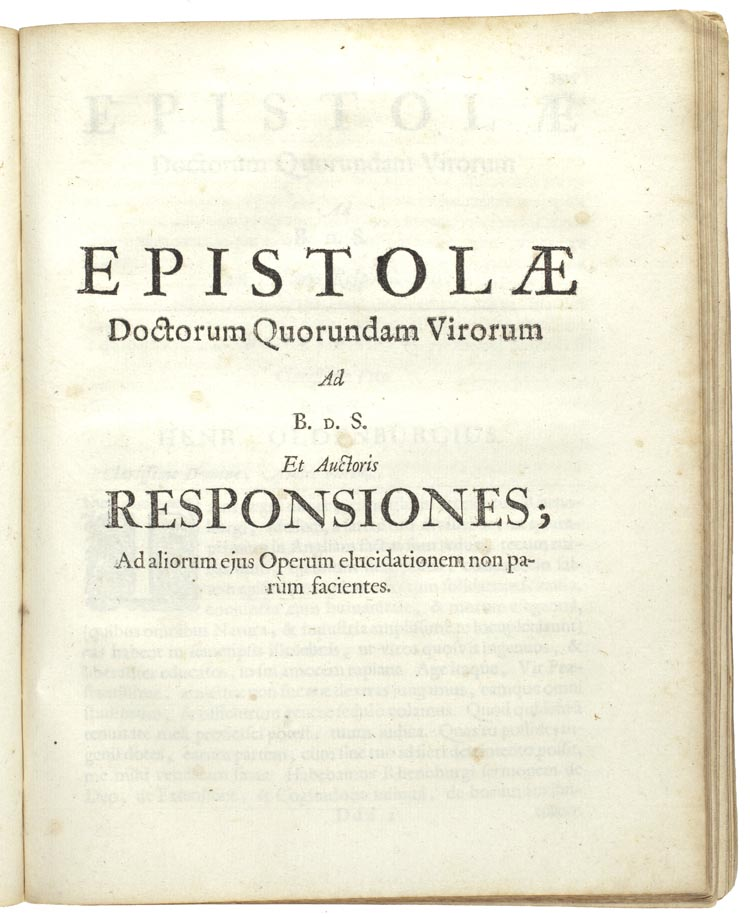
B.d.S.: Epistolae doctorum quorumdam virorum, 1677, in Latin and Dutch, title page (translated title: Letters of learned men with answers). Published posthumously.

Benedictus de Spinoza's correspondents include, with the years of their letters:

- Willem van Blijenbergh (1632–1696), 1664-1665

A Dordrecht grain merchant, regent and writer, who corresponded with Spinoza on free will and after Spinoza's death published books opposing his Tractatus Theologico-Politicus and Ethica. Letters WvB to Spinoza (Gebhardt letter number 18: 12-12-1664, 20: 16-01-1665, 22: 19-02-1665, 24: 27-03-1665) and Spinoza to WvB (Gebhardt letter number 19: 05-01-1665, 21, 23: 13-03-1665, 27: 03-06-1665).

- Johannes Bouwmeester, 1665-1666, 1673
- Hugo Boxel Danielsz, 1674
- Robert Boyle, 1663
- Albert Burgh (franciscan), 1675

The franciscan Albert Burgh (1650-1708) wrote to Spinoza from Rome to challenge his rationalistic errors and disbelief in Christ. Spinoza's answer is famous: it is ridiculous that the Roman-Catholic Church damns people who are misled by the devil for eternity, while the devil himself is not punished.

- Johann Georg Graevius, 1673
- Johannes Hudde, 1666, 1671
- Gottfried Leibniz

In 1676 Leibniz visited Spinoza to discuss metempsychosis/reincarnation as in Pythagoras's work. Leibniz kept his visit secret. In 1714 he published a moderate vision that reconciled religion and science.

- Lodewijk Meyer, 1663
- Henry Oldenburg, 1661-1663, 1665, 1675-167

Petrus Serrarius (Pieter Serrurier) introduced Oldenburg, secretary of the Royal Society in London, to Spinoza and served as a courier for the letters between Oldenburg and Spinoza.

- Jacob Ostens, 1671
- Jan Rieuwertszn Sr., 1674
- George Hermann Schuller, 1674-1676
- Nicholas Steno, 1671
- Ehrenfried Walther von Tschirnhaus, 1674-1676

Spinoza took the initiative for a correspondence with German physicist and mathematician Ehrenfried Walther von Tschirnhaus, who had studied in Leiden. According to Jonathan Israel Spinoza was inspired and stimulated in his later years by discussions with von Tschirnhaus about free will, human motivation and the mechanical laws of motion of Descartes. Von Tschirnhaus visited Spinoza and through Spinoza came into contact with Henry Oldenburg, secretary of the Royal Society in London.

- Simon Joosten de Vries, 1663
- Lambert van Velthuysen, 1671, 1675

The Utrecht physician Lambert van Velthuysen (1622-1685) had criticised Spinoza's concept of God. He accused Spinoza of a blind surrender to Fate: fatalism. The God defined by Spinoza possessed no divine will, so according to Van Velthuysen this God could not be any longer the touchstone for 'good' and 'evil'. Morals and virtue were endangered this way, leading to insecurity. Furthermore, the authority of the Bible was undermined, for when God was not able to procure a moral judgment, the Bible was nothing more than rhetoric. Spinoza was not impressed and sent Van Velthuysen a strongly worded refutation.
Nonetheless Spinoza and Van Velthuysen remained in contact: starting with 1673 they visited regularly and assisted each other with publications. In the conflict of Descartes with the Utrecht theologian Gisbertus Voetius both sided with Descartes.

== English translations ==
- 1884 by R. H. L. Elwes, in the second volume of The Chief Works of Benedict de Spinoza (George Bell & Sons, London).
- 1928 by A. Wolf, with introduction and notes (Allen and Unwin, London). Reissued in 1966 (Frank Cass, New York) and 2021 by Routledge in the 17th Century Philosophy series.
- 1995 by Samuel Shirley, with an Introduction and Notes by Steven Barbone, Lee Rice and Jacob Adler (Hacket Publications). A selection was previously published with the translation of the Ethics (1982), and the complete edition was later added to his translation of the Complete Works in one volume, with introduction and notes by Michael L. Morgan (also Hacket Publications, 2002).
- By Edwin Curley, with introduction and notes, spread across the two volumes of his translation of The Collected Works of Spinoza (Princeton University Press). First volume issued on 1985 (letters from 1661 to September 1665), and the Second in 2016 (from September 1665 to 1676). Also a selection was separately issued with other texts in A Spinoza Reader (Princeton University Press, 1994).

== Literature ==
- Nadler, Stephen (1999). Spinoza: A Life. Cambridge: Cambridge University Press. ISBN 9780521552103.
  - Nadler, Stephen (2007). Spinoza. Amsterdam: Olympus, Amstel Uitgevers. ISBN 9789046700211. Dutch translation.
- Israel, Jonathan (2002). Radical Enlightenment: Philosophy and the Making of Modernity, 1650–1750. ISBN 0-19-820608-9 hbk (hardback); ISBN 0-199-25456-7 sbk (softback).
