= Baruch Spinoza =

Portuguese-Dutch philosopher (1632–1677)

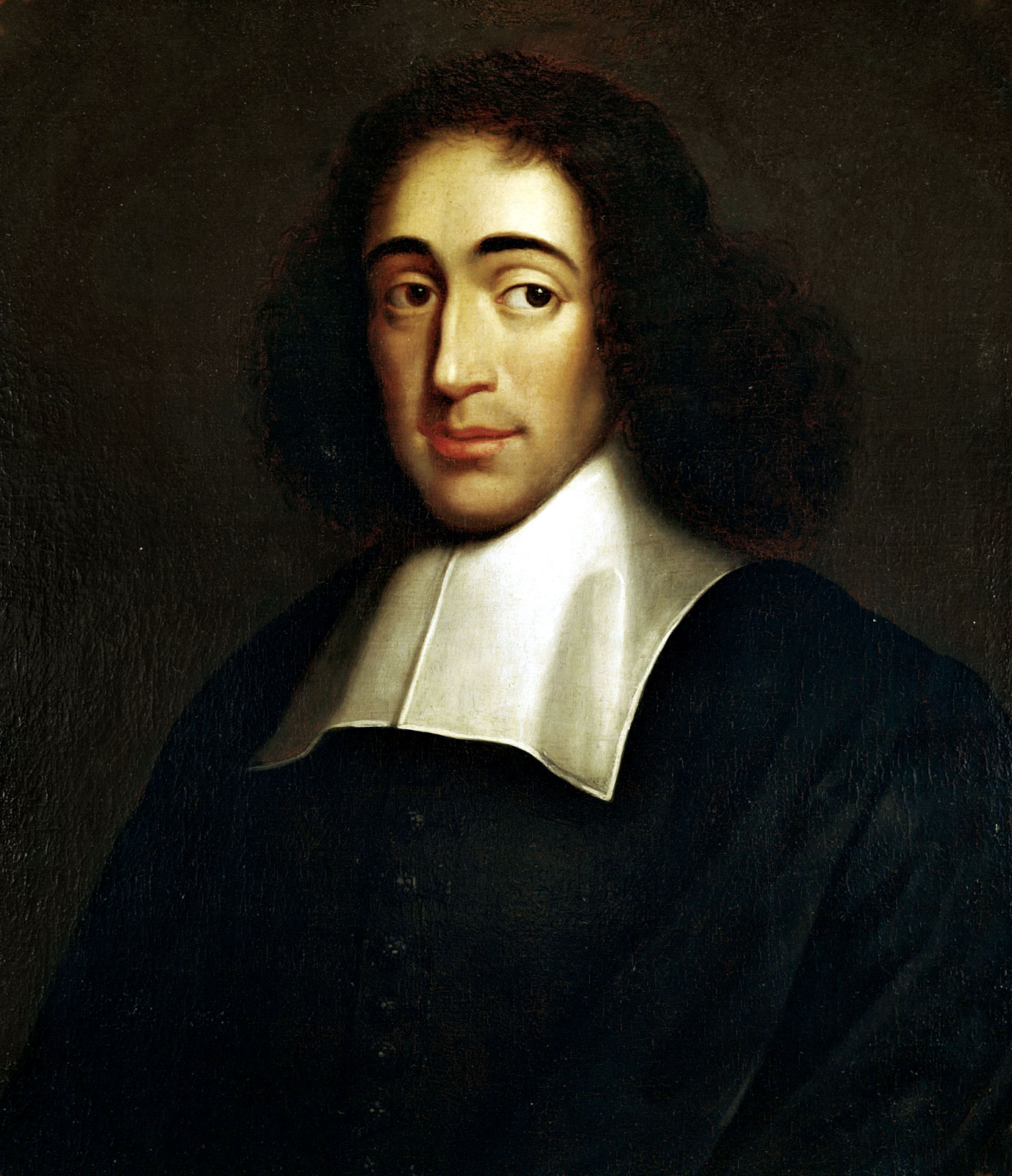
- Portrait of Spinoza c. 1665
- Born: Baruch Espinosa / Bento de Spinosa; 24 November 1632; Amsterdam, Dutch Republic
- Died: 21 February 1677 (aged 44); The Hague, Dutch Republic
- Other name: Benedictus de Spinoza

Education
- Education: Talmud Torah; University of Leiden (attended)

Philosophical work
- Era: 17th-century philosophy; Age of Enlightenment
- Region: Western philosophy
- School: Conceptualism; Correspondence theory of truth (Note: Spinoza has also been interpreted as a defender of the coherence theory of truth.); Direct realism; Foundationalism (according to Hegel); Necessitarianism; post-Cartesianism; Psychological egoism; Rationalism; Substance monism
- Main interests: Epistemology; ethics; Hebrew Bible; metaphysics

Baruch (de) Spinoza (Note: /bəˈruːk spɪˈnoʊzə/; Dutch: [baːˈrux spɪˈnoːzaː]; Portuguese: [̍bẽto ðɨ eʃpiˈnɔzɐ]; Hebrew: ברוך שפינוזה. His boyhood and early adult business name was the Portuguese "Bento", his synagogue name the Hebrew translation "Baruch", and, in his correspondence, he primarily signed his name as the Latin translation "Benedictus". All three names literally mean "blessed". The surname spellings "Espinosa" and "Espinoza", as used by his family, also appear in documents from his early life.) (24 November 1632 – 21 February 1677), also known under his Latinized pen name Benedictus de Spinoza, was a philosopher of Portuguese-Jewish origin who was born and lived in the Dutch Republic. A forerunner of the Enlightenment, Spinoza significantly influenced modern biblical criticism, 17th-century rationalism, and Dutch intellectual culture, establishing himself as one of the most important and radical philosophers of the early modern period. Influenced by Stoicism, Thomas Hobbes, René Descartes, and heterodox Christians, Spinoza was a leading philosopher of the Dutch Golden Age.

Spinoza was born in Amsterdam to a marrano family that fled Portugal for the more tolerant Dutch Republic. He received a traditional Jewish education, learning Hebrew and studying sacred texts within the Portuguese-Jewish community, where his father was a prominent merchant. As a young man, Spinoza challenged rabbinic authority and questioned Jewish doctrines, leading to his permanent expulsion from his Jewish community in 1656. Following that expulsion, he distanced himself from all religious affiliations and devoted himself to philosophical inquiry, supporting himself by lens grinding. Spinoza attracted a dedicated circle of followers who gathered to discuss his writings and joined him in the intellectual pursuit of truth.

Spinoza published sparingly during his lifetime to circumvent persecution and the suppression of his works. In his Tractatus Theologico-Politicus, described by Steven Nadler as "one of the most important books of Western thought", Spinoza questioned the divine origin of the Hebrew Bible and the nature of God while arguing that ecclesiastic authority should have no role in a secular, democratic state. Ethics equates God with nature, arguing for a view of God that scholars interpret variously as pantheistic, panentheistic, or atheistic, and it explores the place of human freedom in a world devoid of theological, cosmological, and political moorings. Rejecting messianism and the emphasis on the afterlife, Spinoza emphasized appreciating and valuing life for oneself and others. By advocating for individual liberty in its moral, psychological, and metaphysical dimensions, Spinoza helped establish the genre of political writing called secular theology.

Spinoza's philosophy addresses multiple areas of philosophical discourse, including metaphysics, epistemology, political philosophy, ethics, philosophy of mind, and philosophy of science. His works were published posthumously by his friends and influenced philosophers for the next two centuries. Spinoza is celebrated as one of the most original and influential thinkers of the seventeenth century. Rebecca Goldstein described him as "the renegade Jew who gave us modernity".

== Biography ==
=== Family background ===
Spinoza's ancestors, adherents of crypto-Judaism, faced persecution during the Portuguese Inquisition, including torture and public displays of humiliation. In 1597, his paternal grandfather's family left Vidigueira for Nantes and lived outwardly as New Christians, eventually transferring to Holland for an unknown reason. His maternal ancestors were a leading Porto commercial family, and his maternal grandfather was a foremost merchant who drifted between Judaism and Christianity. Spinoza was raised by his grandmother from ages six to nine and probably learned much about his family history from her.

Spinoza's father, Michael, was a prominent and wealthy merchant in Amsterdam with a business that had a wide geographical reach. In 1649, Michael was elected to serve as an administrative officer of the recently united congregation Talmud Torah. He married his cousin Rachael d'Espinosa, daughter of his uncle Abraham d'Espinosa, who was also a community leader and Michael's business partner. Marrying cousins was common in the Portuguese Jewish community then, giving Michael access to his father-in-law's commercial network and capital. Rachel's children died in infancy, and she died in 1627.

After the death of Rachel, Michael married Hannah Deborah, with whom he had five children. His second wife brought a dowry to the marriage that was absorbed into Michael's business capital instead of being set aside for her children, which may have caused a grudge between Spinoza and his father. The family lived on the artificial island on the south side of the River Amstel, known as the Vlooienburg, at the fifth house along the Houtgracht canal. The Jewish quarter was not formally divided. The family lived close to the Bet Ya'acov synagogue, and nearby were Christians, including the artist Rembrandt. Miriam was their first child, followed by Isaac, who was expected to take over as head of the family and the commercial enterprise, but died in 1649. Baruch Espinosa, the third child, was born on 24 November 1632 and named as per tradition for his maternal grandfather.

Spinoza's younger brother, Gabriel, was born in 1634, followed by another sister, Rebecca. Miriam married Samuel de Caceres but died shortly after childbirth. According to Jewish practice, Samuel had to marry his former sister-in-law Rebecca. Following his brother's death, Spinoza's place as head of the family and its business meant scholarly ambitions were pushed aside. Spinoza's mother, Hannah Deborah, died when Spinoza was six years old. Michael's third wife, Esther, raised Spinoza from age nine; she lacked formal Jewish knowledge due to growing up a New Christian and only spoke Portuguese at home. The marriage was childless. Spinoza's sister Rebecca, brother Gabriel, and nephew eventually migrated to Curaçao, and the remaining family joined them after Spinoza's death.

==== Uriel da Costa's early influence ====
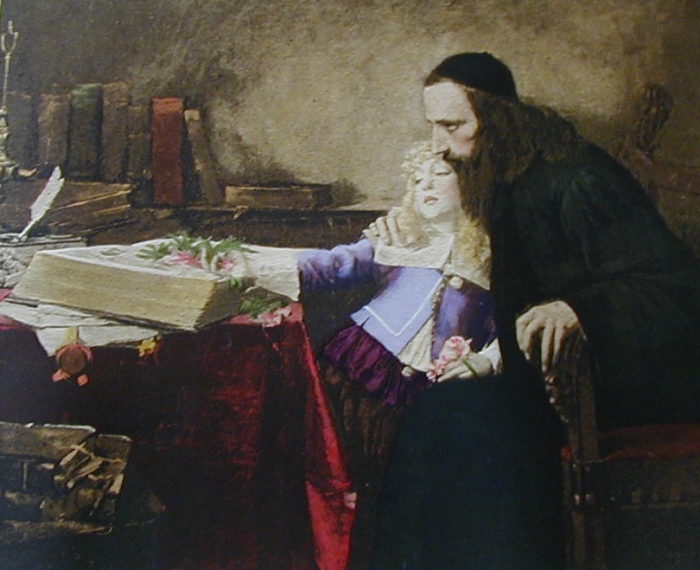
Samuel Hirszenberg's imagined scene of Uriel da Costa instructing Spinoza (1901)

Through his mother, Spinoza was related to the philosopher Uriel da Costa, who stirred controversy in Amsterdam's Portuguese Jewish community. Da Costa questioned traditional Christian and Jewish beliefs, asserting that, for example, their origins were based on human inventions instead of God's revelation. His clashes with the religious establishment led to his excommunication twice by rabbinic authorities, who imposed humiliation and social exclusion. In 1639, as part of an agreement to be readmitted, da Costa had to prostrate himself for worshippers to step over him. He died in 1640, reportedly committing suicide.

During his childhood, Spinoza was likely unaware of his family connection with Uriel da Costa; still, as a teenager, he certainly heard discussions about him. Steven Nadler explains that, although da Costa died when Spinoza was eight, his ideas shaped Spinoza's intellectual development. Amsterdam's Jewish communities long remembered and discussed da Costa's skepticism about organized religion, denial of the soul's immortality, and the idea that Moses didn't write the Torah, influencing Spinoza's intellectual journey.

=== Early life ===
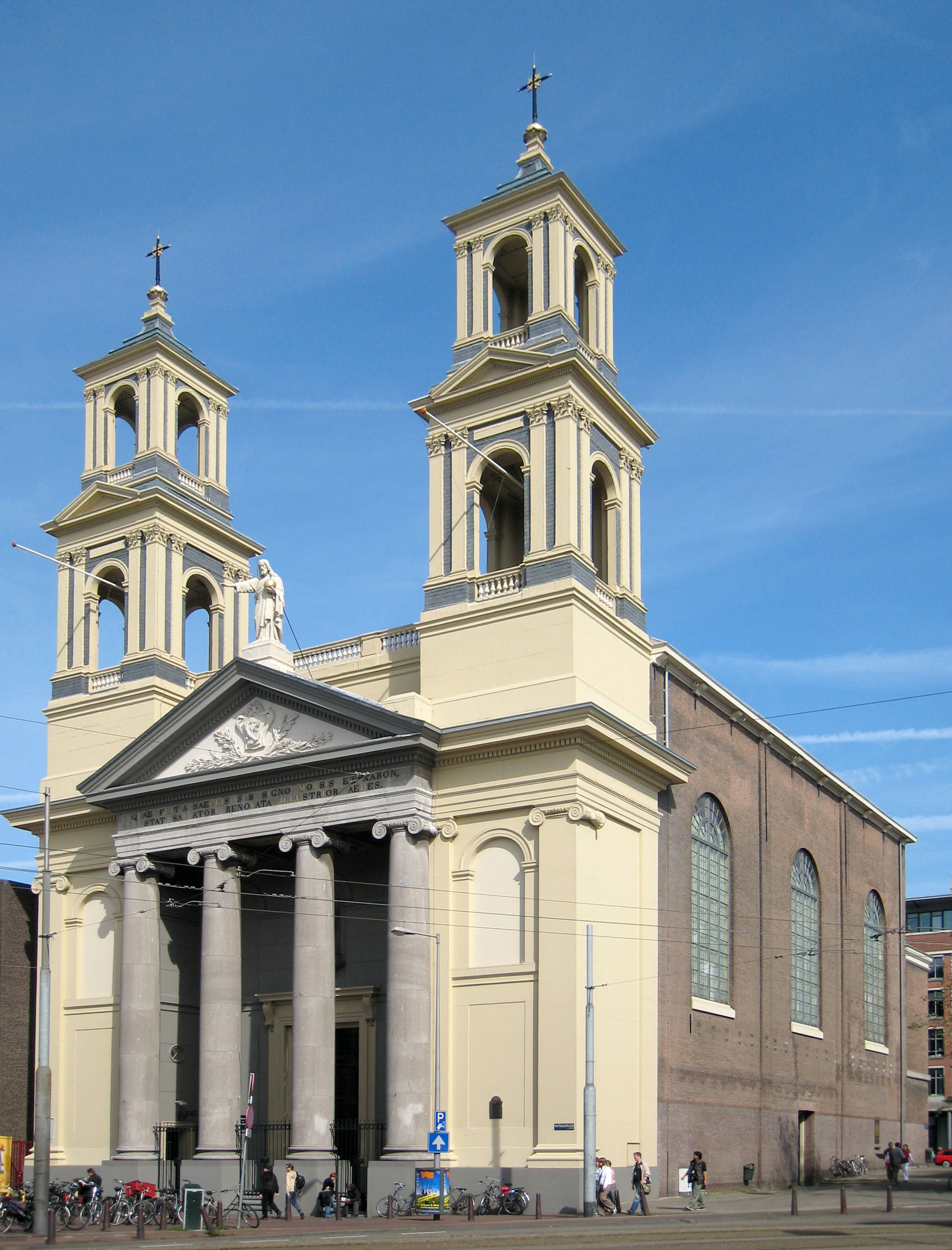
The Moses and Aaron Church now stands at the site of Spinoza's childhood home.

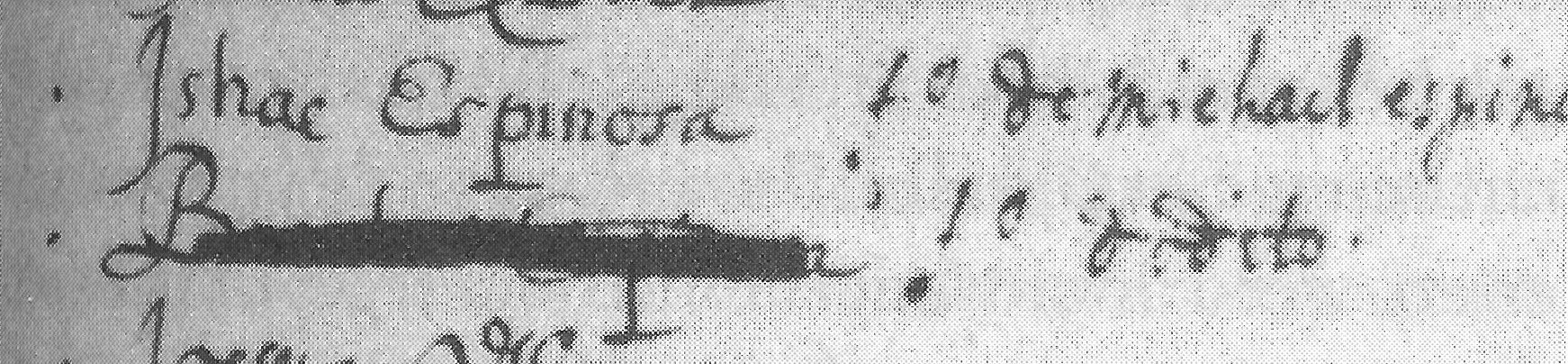
Spinoza's name crossed out on the list of pupils of Talmud Torah

Spinoza attended the Talmud Torah school adjoining the Bet Ya'acov synagogue, a few doors down from his home, headed by the senior Rabbi Saul Levi Morteira. Instructed in Spanish, the language of learning and literature, students in the elementary school learned to read the prayerbook and the Torah in Hebrew, translate the weekly section into Spanish, and study Rashi's commentary. Spinoza's name does not appear on the registry after age fourteen, and he likely never studied with rabbis such as Manasseh ben Israel and Morteira. Spinoza possibly went to work around fourteen and almost certainly was needed in his father's business after his brother died in 1649.

During the First Anglo-Dutch War, much of the Spinoza firm's ships and cargo were captured by English ships, severely affecting the firm's financial viability. The firm was saddled with debt by the war's end in 1654 due to its merchant voyages being intercepted by the English, leading to its decline. Spinoza's father died in 1654, making Baruch the head of the family, responsible for organizing and leading the Jewish mourning rituals, and in a business partnership with his brother in their inherited firm. As Spinoza's father had poor health for some years before his death, he was significantly involved in the business, putting his intellectual curiosity on hold. Until 1656, he continued financially supporting the synagogue and attending services in compliance with synagogue conventions and practice. By 1655, the family's wealth had evaporated, and the business effectively ended.

In March 1656, Spinoza went to the city authorities for protection against debts in the Portuguese Jewish community. To free himself from the responsibility of paying debts owed by his father, Spinoza appealed to the city to declare him an orphan; since he was a legal minor, not understanding his father's indebtedness would remove the obligation to repay his debts and retrospectively renounce his inheritance. Though he was released of all debts and legally in the right, his reputation as a merchant was permanently damaged, in addition to violating a synagogue regulation that business matters are to be arbitrated within the community.

=== Expulsion from the Jewish community ===
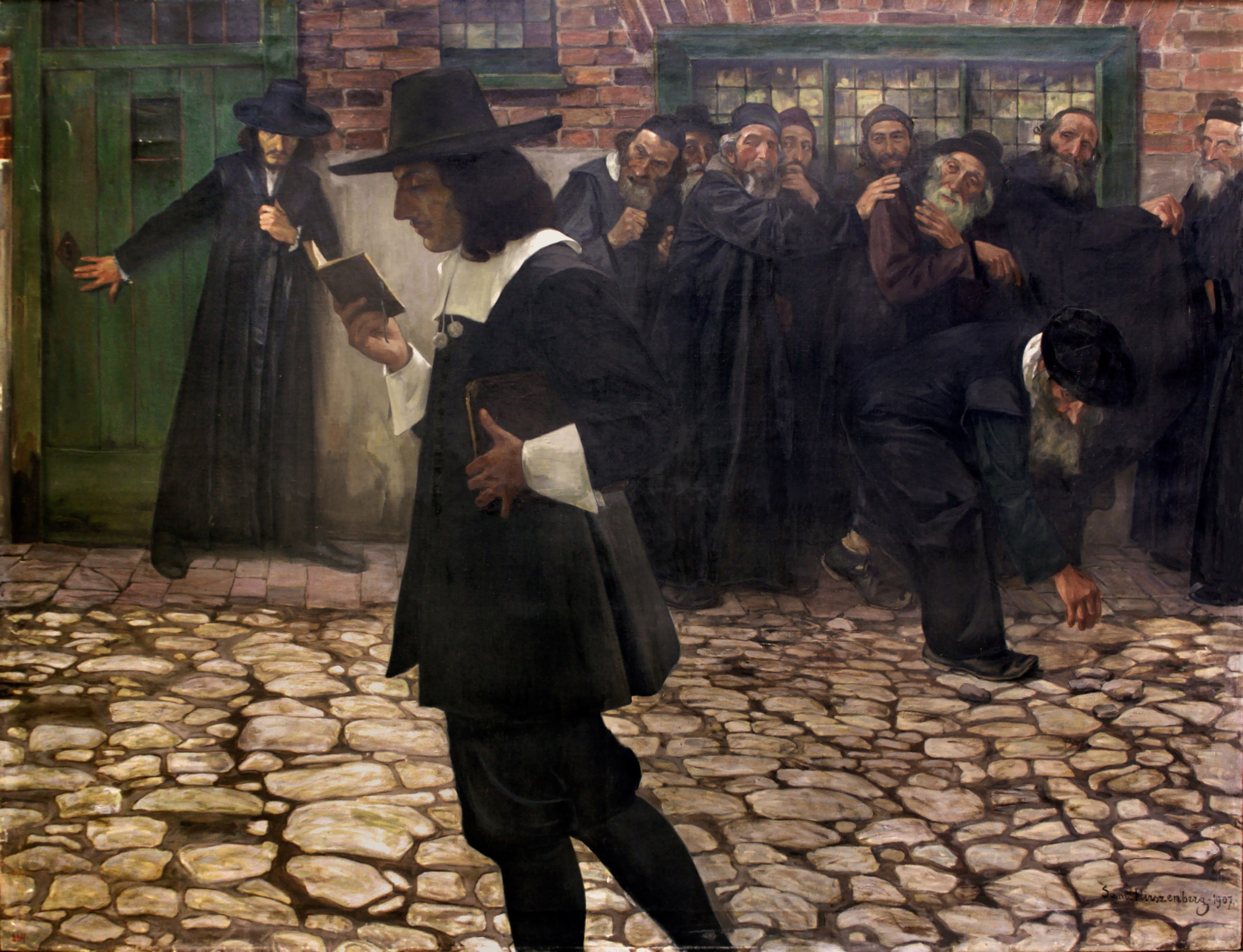
Excommunicated Spinoza by Samuel Hirszenberg (1907), the second of his two modern paintings imagining scenes of Spinoza's life

Amsterdam was tolerant of religious diversity so long as it was practiced discreetly. The community was concerned with protecting its reputation and not associating with Spinoza lest his controversial views provide the basis for possible persecution or expulsion. Spinoza did not openly break with Jewish authorities until his father died in 1654 when he became public and defiant, resulting from lengthy and stressful religious, financial, and legal clashes involving his business and synagogue, such as when Spinoza violated synagogue regulations by going to city authorities rather than resolving his disputes within the community to free himself from paying his father's debt.

On 27 July 1656, the Talmud Torah community leaders, which included Aboab de Fonseca, issued a writ of herem against the 23-year-old Spinoza. Spinoza's censure was the harshest ever pronounced in the community, carrying tremendous emotional and spiritual impact. The exact reason for expelling Spinoza is not stated, only referring to his "abominable heresies", "monstrous deeds", and the testimony of witnesses "in the presence of the said Espinoza". Even though the Amsterdam municipal authorities were not directly involved in Spinoza's censure, the town council expressly ordered the Portuguese-Jewish community to regulate their conduct and ensure that the community kept strict observance of Jewish law. Other evidence indicates a concern about upsetting civil authorities, such as the synagogue's bans on public weddings, funeral processions, and discussing religious matters with Christians, lest such activity might "disturb the liberty we enjoy".

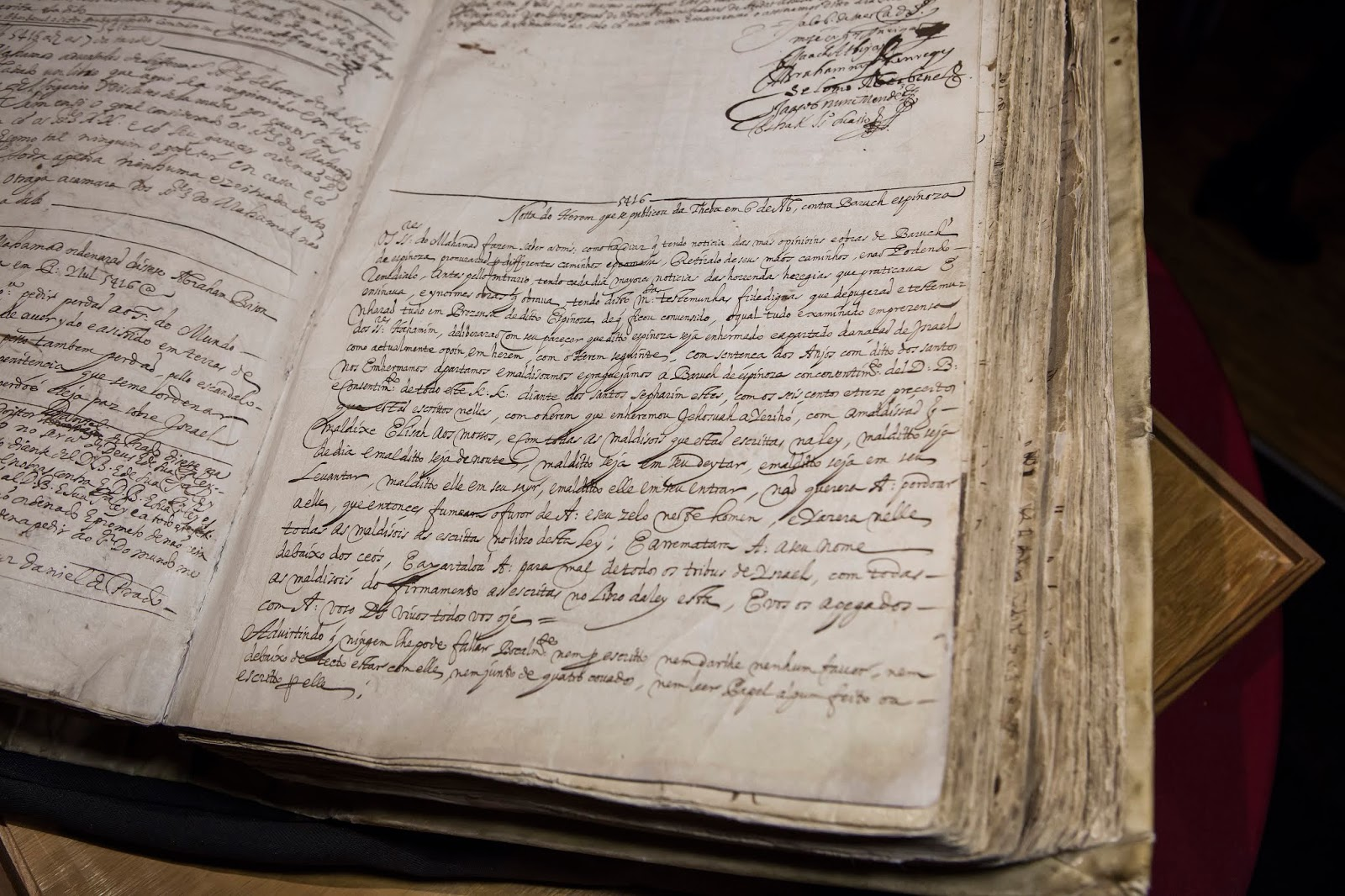
Text of Spinoza's expulsion on 6 Av 5416 (27 July 1656)

Before the expulsion, Spinoza had not published anything or written a treatise; Steven Nadler states that if Spinoza was voicing his criticism of Judaism that later appeared through his philosophical works, such as Part I of Ethics, then there can be no wonder that he was severely punished. Unlike most censures issued by the Amsterdam congregation, it was never rescinded since the censure did not lead to repentance. After the censure, Spinoza may have written an Apologia in Spanish defending his views, but it is now lost. Spinoza's expulsion did not lead him to convert to Christianity or belong to a confessional religion or sect. From 1656 to 1661, Spinoza found lodgings elsewhere in Amsterdam and Leiden, supporting himself with teaching while learning lens grinding and constructing microscopes and telescopes. Spinoza did not maintain a sense of Jewish identity; he argued that without adherence to Jewish law, the Jewish people lacked a sustaining source of difference and identity, rendering the notion of a secular Jew incoherent.

=== Education and study group ===
Sometime between 1654 and 1657, Spinoza started studying Latin with political radical Franciscus van den Enden, a former Jesuit and atheist, who likely introduced Spinoza to scholastic and modern philosophy, including Descartes, who had a dominant influence on Spinoza's philosophy. While boarding with Van den Enden, Spinoza studied in his school, where he learned the arts and sciences and likely taught others. He likely took part in the school's theatrical performances, which were used as a pedagogical tool in Van den Enden's curriculum. Many of his friends were either secularized freethinkers or belonged to dissident Christian groups that rejected the authority of established churches and traditional dogmas. Spinoza was acquainted with members of the Collegiants, a group of disaffected Mennonites and other dissenting Reformed sects that shunned official theology and must have played some role in Spinoza's developing views on religion and directed him to Van den Enden. Jonathan Israel conjectures that another possible influential figure was the atheist translator Jan Hendriksz Glazemaker, a collaborator of Spinoza's friend and publisher Rieuwertsz, who could not have mentored Spinoza but was in a unique position to introduce Spinoza to Cartesian philosophy, mathematics, and lens grinding.

After learning Latin with Van den Enden, Spinoza studied at Leiden University around 1658, where he audited classes in Cartesian philosophy. (Note: Steven Nadler speculates that Spinoza Latinized his name at Leiden because all instruction was in Latin.) From 1656 to 1661, Spinoza's main discussion partners who formed his circle and played a formative part in Spinoza's life were Van den Enden, Pieter Balling, Jarig Jelles, Lodewijk Meyer, Johannes Bouwmeester and Adriaan Koerbagh. Spinoza's following, or philosophical sect, scrutinized the propositions of the Ethics while it was in draft and Spinoza's second text, Short Treatise on God, Man, and His Well-Being. Though a few prominent people in Amsterdam discussed the teachings of the secretive but marginal group, it was mainly a testing ground for Spinoza's philosophy to extend his challenge to the status quo. Their public reputation in Amsterdam was negative, with Ole Borch disparaging them as "atheists". Throughout his life, Spinoza's general approach was to avoid intellectual battles, clashes, and public controversies, viewing them as a waste of energy that served no real purpose.

=== Career as a philosopher ===
==== Rijnsburg ====
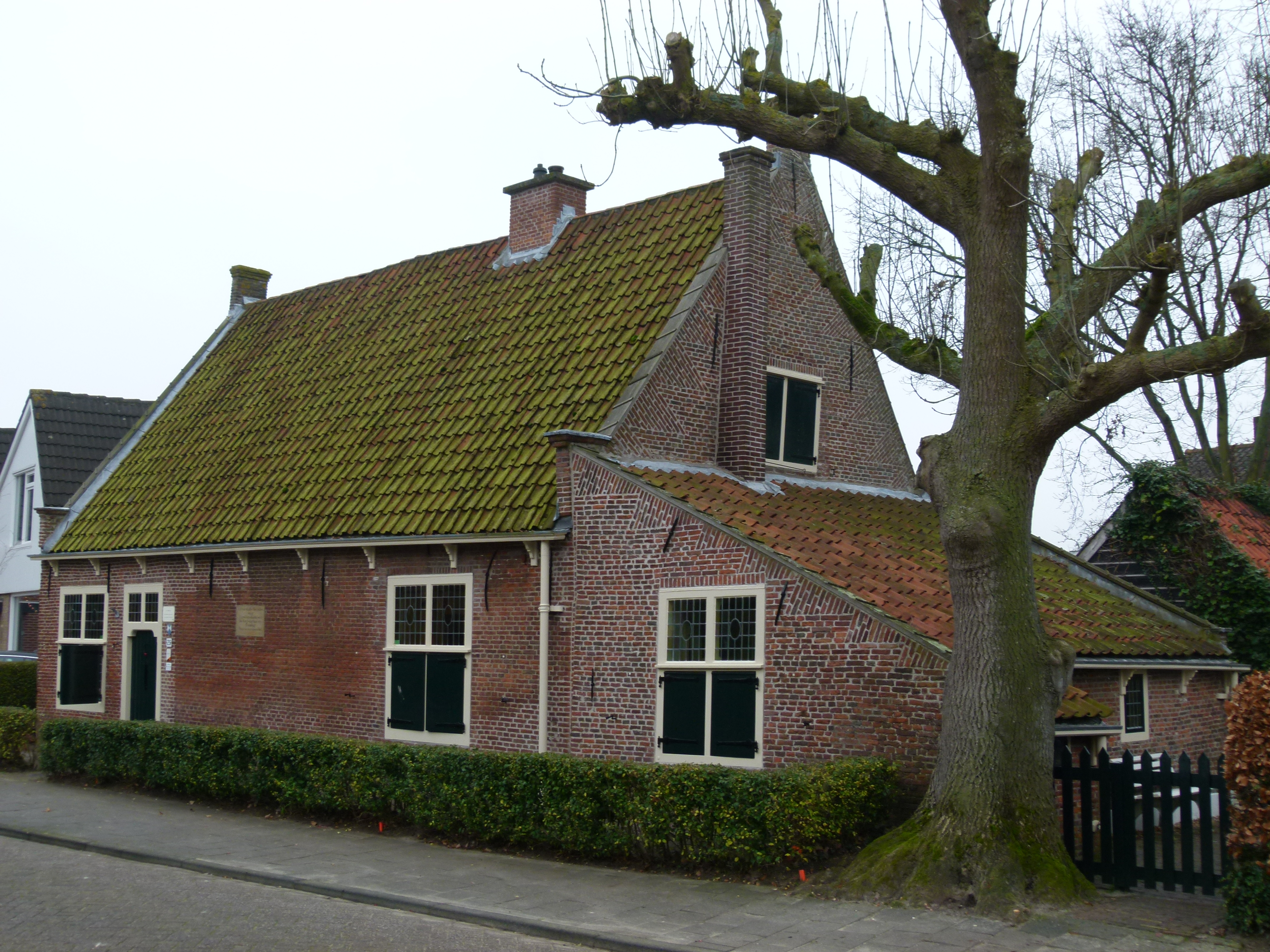
Spinoza's lodging in Rijnsburg, now a museum

Between 1660 and 1661, Spinoza moved from Amsterdam to Rijnsburg, allowing for a quiet retreat in the country and access to the university town, Leiden, where he still had many friends. Around this time, he wrote his Short Treatise on God, Man, and His Well-Being, which he never published in his lifetime, thinking it would enrage the theologians, synods, and city magistrates. The Short Treatise, a long-forgotten text that only survived in Dutch translation, was first published by Johannes van Vloten in 1862. While lodging with Herman Homan in Rijnsburg, Spinoza produced lenses and instruments to support himself and out of scientific interest. He began working on his Ethics and Descartes' Principles of Philosophy, which he completed in two weeks, communicating and interpreting Descartes' arguments and testing the water for his metaphysical and ethical ideas. Spinoza's explanations of the essential elements of the Cartesian system helped many interested people study it, enhancing his philosophical reputation. This work was published in 1663 and was one of the two works published in his lifetime under his name. Spinoza led a modest and frugal lifestyle, earning income by polishing lenses and crafting telescopes and microscopes. He also relied on the generous contributions of his friends to support himself.

==== Voorburg ====
In 1663, Spinoza moved to Voorburg for an unknown reason. He continued working on Ethics and corresponded with scientists and philosophers throughout Europe. In 1665, he began writing the Theological-Political Treatise, which addresses theological and political issues such as the interpretation of scripture, the origins of the state, and the bounds of political and religious authority while arguing for a secular, democratic state.

Before the publication of the Theological-Political Treatise, Spinoza's friend Adriaan Koerbagh published a book that criticized organized religion, denied the divine authorship of the Bible, and asserted that miracles were impossible—ideas similar to those of Spinoza. His work attracted the attention of the authorities, leading to his imprisonment and eventual death in prison. Around this time, Spinoza likely depicted himself as rebel fisherman Masaniello in a private sketchbook.

Anticipating the reaction to his ideas, he published his treatise in 1670 under a false publisher and a fictitious place of publication. The work did not remain anonymous for long. Samuel Maresius attacked Spinoza personally, while Thomas Hobbes and Johannes Bredenburg criticized his conception of God and saw the book as dangerous and subversive. Spinoza's work was safer than Koerbagh's because it was written in Latin, a language not widely understood by the general public, and Spinoza forbade its translation. The secular authorities varied in enforcing the Reformed Church in Amsterdam's orders to ban the distribution of the blasphemous book.

==== The Hague ====
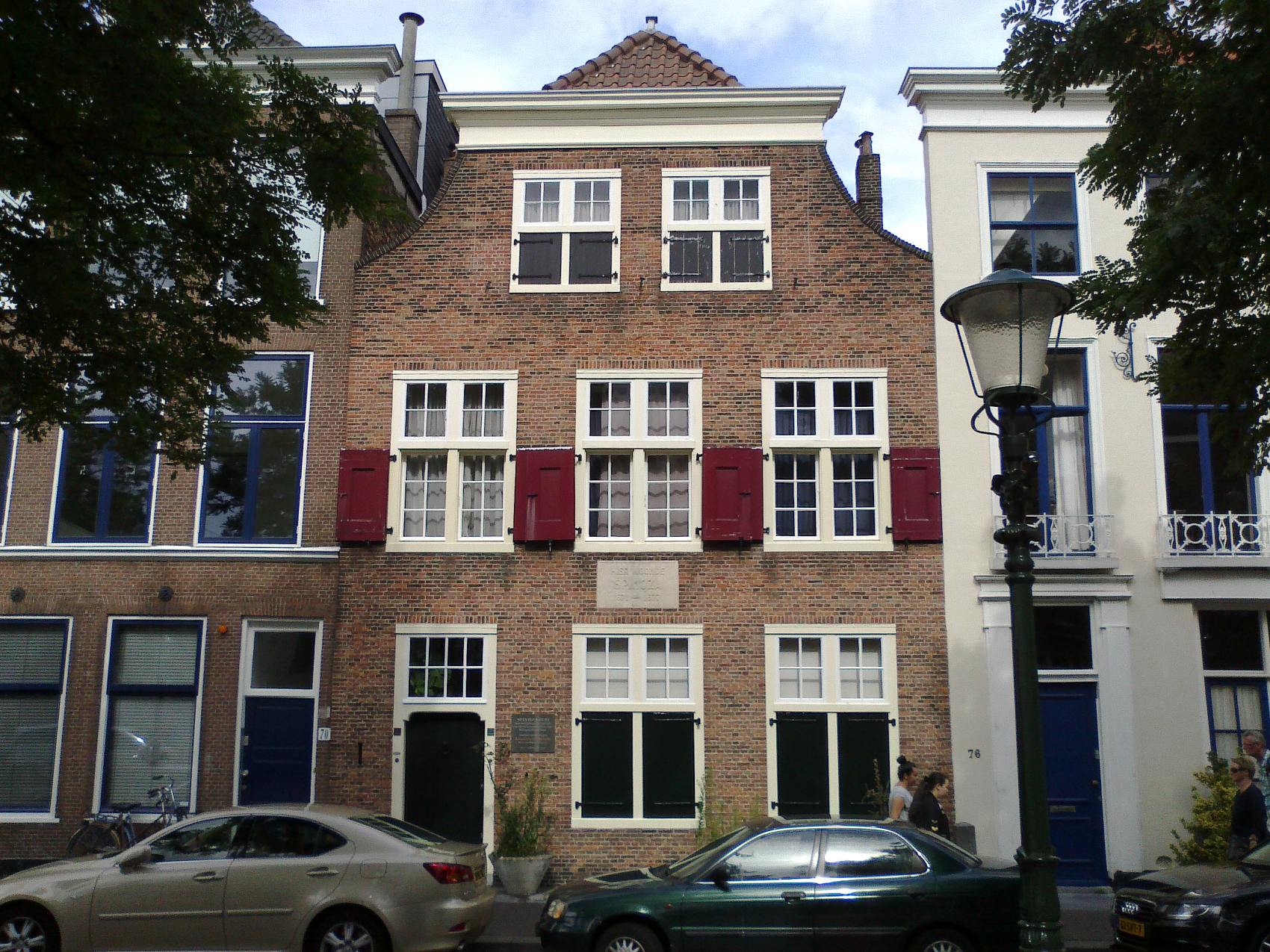
Spinoza's house in The Hague, where he died

In 1670, Spinoza moved to The Hague for easier access to intellectual life with his friends and followers. As he became more famous, Spinoza spent time receiving visitors and responding to letters. He returned to the manuscript of Ethics, reworking part Three into parts Four and Five, and composed a Hebrew grammar for proper interpretation of scripture and for clearing up confusion and problems when studying the Bible, with part One presenting etymology, the alphabet, and principles governing nouns, verbs, and more. Part Two, unfinished before he died, would have presented syntax rules. Another unfinished work from 1676 was Tractatus Politicus, which concerns how states can function well and was intended to show that democratic states are best. Spinoza refused an offer to be the chair of philosophy at the University of Heidelberg, perhaps because of the possibility that it might curb his freedom of thought.

==== Correspondence ====
Few of Spinoza's letters are extant, and none before 1661. Nearly all the contents are philosophical and technical because the original editors of Opera Posthuma—a collection of his works published posthumously—Lodewijk Meyer, Georg Hermann Schuller, and Johannes Bouwmeester, excluded personal matters and letters due to the political and ecclesiastical persecution of the time. Spinoza corresponded with Peter Serrarius, a radical Protestant and millenarian merchant, who was a patron of Spinoza after his expulsion from the Jewish community. He acted as an intermediary for Spinoza's correspondence, sending and receiving letters of the philosopher to and from third parties. They maintained their relationship until Serrarius died in 1669.

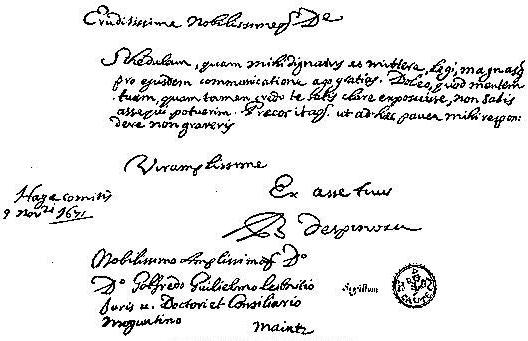
Letter from Spinoza to Leibniz, with his BdS seal

Through his pursuits in lens grinding, mathematics, optics, and philosophy, Spinoza forged connections with prominent figures, including the scientist Christiaan Huygens, the mathematician Johannes Hudde, and the Secretary of the British Royal Society, Henry Oldenburg. Huygens and others notably praised the quality of Spinoza's lenses. Spinoza engaged in correspondence with Willem van Blijenbergh, an amateur Calvinist theologian, who sought Spinoza's view on the nature of evil and sin. Whereas Blijenbergh deferred to the authority of scripture in theology and philosophy, Spinoza told him not to look solely to scripture for truth or to anthropomorphize God. Also, Spinoza told him their views were incommensurable. Gottfried Wilhelm Leibniz outwardly described Spinoza's work negatively but privately wrote letters to him and desired to examine the manuscript of the Ethics. In 1676, Leibniz traveled to The Hague to meet Spinoza, remaining with him for three days to converse about current events and philosophy. Leibniz's work bears some striking resemblances to parts of Spinoza's philosophy, like in Monadology. Leibniz was concerned when his name was not redacted in a letter printed in the Opera Posthuma. In 1675, Albert Burgh, a friend and possibly former pupil of Spinoza, wrote to him repudiating his teachings and announcing his conversion to the Catholic Church. Burgh attacked Spinoza's views as expressed in the Theological-Political Treatise and tried to persuade Spinoza to embrace Catholicism. In response, Spinoza, at the request of Burgh's family, who hoped to restore his reason, wrote an angry letter mocking the Catholic Church and condemning all religious superstition.

Spinoza published little in his lifetime, and most of his formal writings were in Latin, reaching few readers. Apart from Descartes' Principles of Philosophy and the Theologico-Political Treatise, his works appeared in print after his death. Because the reaction to his anonymously published work, Theologico-Political Treatise, was unfavorable, Spinoza told supporters not to translate his works and abstained from publishing further. Following his death, his supporters published his works posthumously in Latin and Dutch. His posthumous works–Opera Posthuma–were edited by his friends in secrecy to prevent the confiscation and destruction of manuscripts. He wore a signet ring to mark his letters, engraved with the Latin word Caute, meaning "Caution", and the image of a thorny rose.

=== Death and rescue of unpublished writings ===
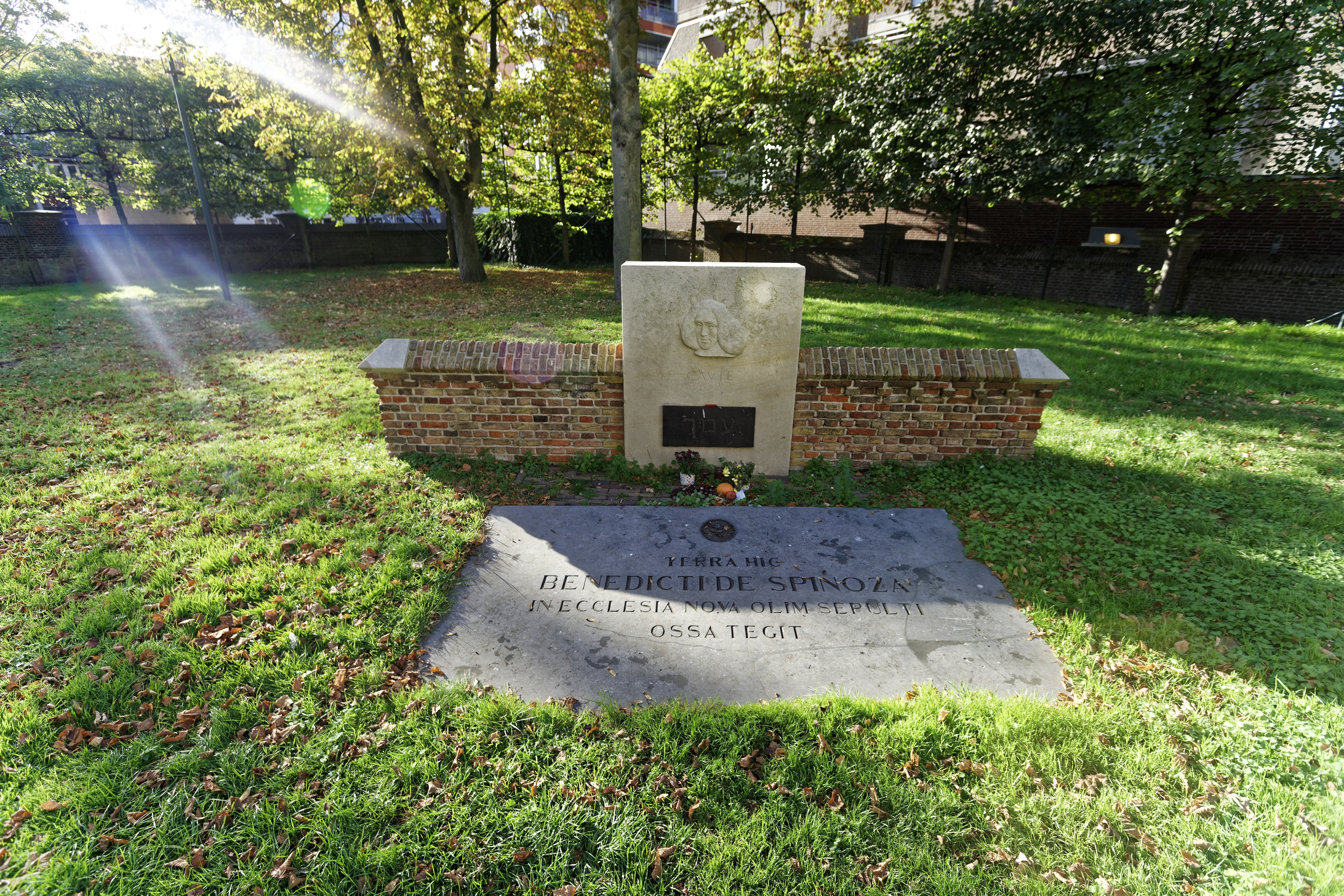
Spinoza's memorial plaque in the churchyard of the Nieuwe Kerk. When he was buried, no tombstone or plaque was prepared. His vault was close to Johan de Witt's remains.

Spinoza's health began to fail in 1676, and he died in The Hague on 21 February 1677 at age 44, attended by a physician friend, Georg Herman Schuller. Spinoza had been ill with some form of lung affliction, probably tuberculosis and possibly complicated by silicosis brought on by grinding glass lenses. Although Spinoza had been becoming sicker for weeks, his death was sudden, and he died without leaving a will. Reports circulated that he repented his philosophical stances on his deathbed, but these tales petered out in the 18th century. Lutheran preacher Johannes Colerus wrote the first biography of Spinoza for the original reason of researching his final days.

Spinoza was buried inside the Nieuwe Kerk four days after his death, with six others in the same vault. At the time, there was no memorial plaque for Spinoza. In the 18th century, the vault was emptied, and its remnants scattered across the churchyard. The memorial plaque is outside the church, where some of his remains are part of the churchyard's soil. Spinoza's friends rescued his personal belongings, papers, and unpublished manuscripts. His supporters took them away for safekeeping from seizure by those wishing to suppress his writings, and they do not appear in the inventory of his possessions at death. Within a year of his death, his supporters translated his Latin manuscripts into Dutch and other languages. Secular authorities and later the Roman Catholic Church banned his works.

== Philosophy ==
=== Ethics ===
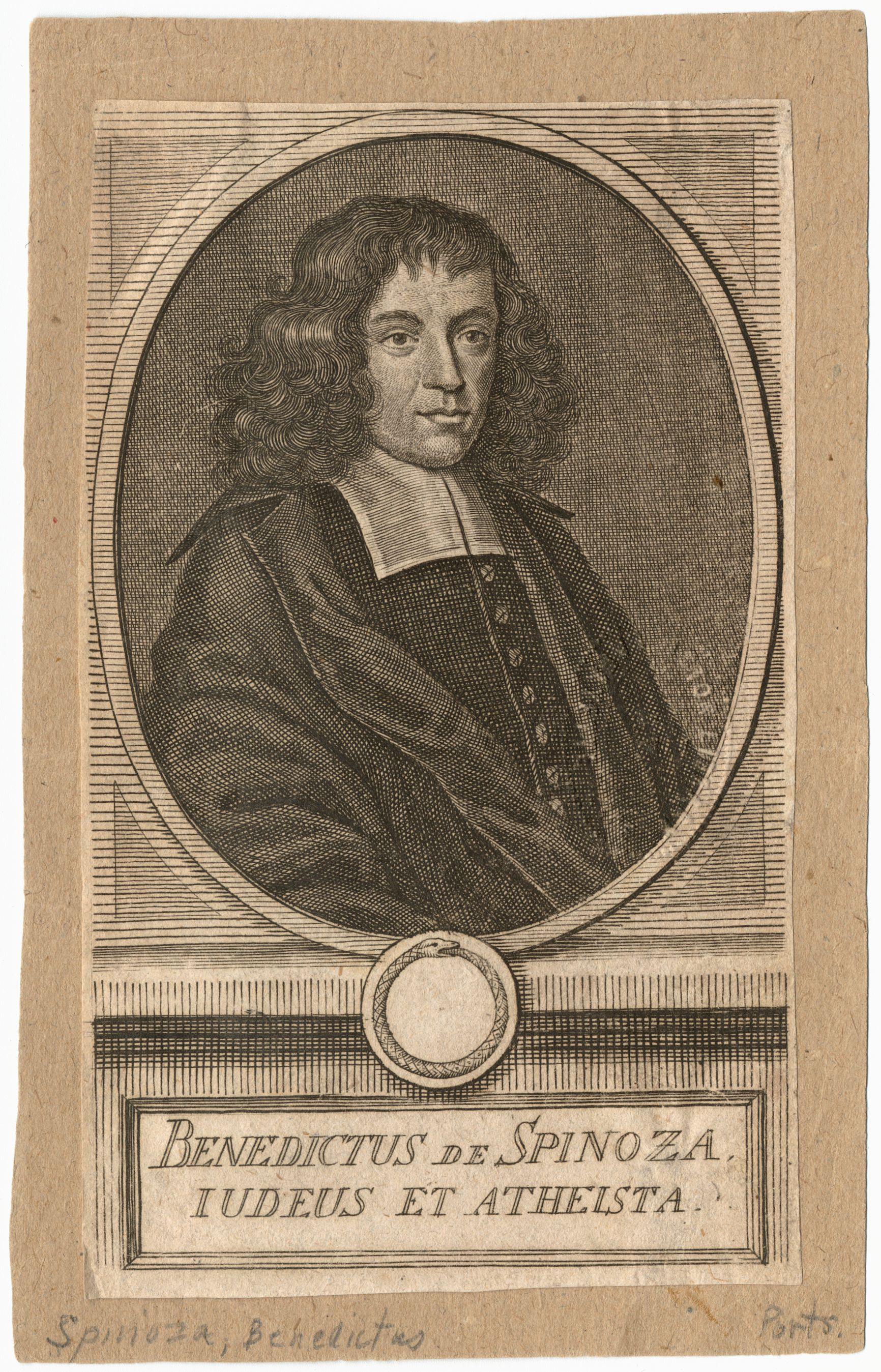
Engraving of Spinoza, captioned in Latin, "A Jew and an atheist"; he vehemently denied being an atheist.

Spinoza considered the Ethics his chief project and philosophical legacy. The work has been associated with that of Leibniz and René Descartes as part of the rationalist school of thought, which includes the assumption that ideas correspond to reality perfectly, in the same way that mathematics is supposed to be an exact representation of the world. The Ethics, a "superbly cryptic masterwork", contains many unresolved obscurities and is written with a forbidding mathematical structure modeled on Euclid's geometry. The writings of René Descartes have been described as "Spinoza's starting point". Spinoza's first publication was his 1663 geometric exposition of proofs using Euclid's model with definitions and axioms of Descartes's Principles of Philosophy. Following Descartes, Spinoza aimed to understand truth through logical deductions from 'clear and distinct ideas', a process that always begins from the 'self-evident truths' of axioms. However, his actual project does not end there: from his first work to his last runs a thread of "attending to the highest good" (which also is the highest truth) and thereby achieving a state of peace and harmony, either metaphysically or politically. In this light, the Principles of Philosophy might be viewed as an "exercise in geometric method and philosophy", paving the way for numerous concepts and conclusions that would define his philosophy (see Cogitata Metaphysica).

==== Metaphysics ====
Spinoza writes in Part I that only one substance is absolutely infinite, eternal, and self-caused (causa sui): "Deus sive Natura" ("God or Nature"). The whole of the universe therefore consists of one substance (God, or, what is the same, Nature) in an example of substance monism. Spinoza's entire mature philosophy, including his views on the mind, knowledge (epistemology), psychology, ethics, politics, and religion, unfolds from this metaphysics.

Following Maimonides, Spinoza defined substance as "that which is in itself and is conceived through itself", meaning that it can be understood without any reference to anything external. Being conceptually independent also means that the same thing is ontologically independent, depending on nothing else for its existence and being the 'cause of itself' (causa sui).

A mode, or modification of this substance, is something that cannot exist independently but rather must be a part of something else on which it depends, including properties (for example color), relations (such as size) and individual things. Modes can be further divided into 'finite' and 'infinite' ones, with the latter being evident in every finite mode (he gives examples of "motion" and "rest").

The traditional understanding of an attribute in philosophy is similar to Spinoza's modes, though he uses that word differently. To him, an attribute is "that which the intellect perceives as constituting the essence of substance", and there are possibly an infinite number of them. It is the essential nature that is "attributed" to reality by intellect.

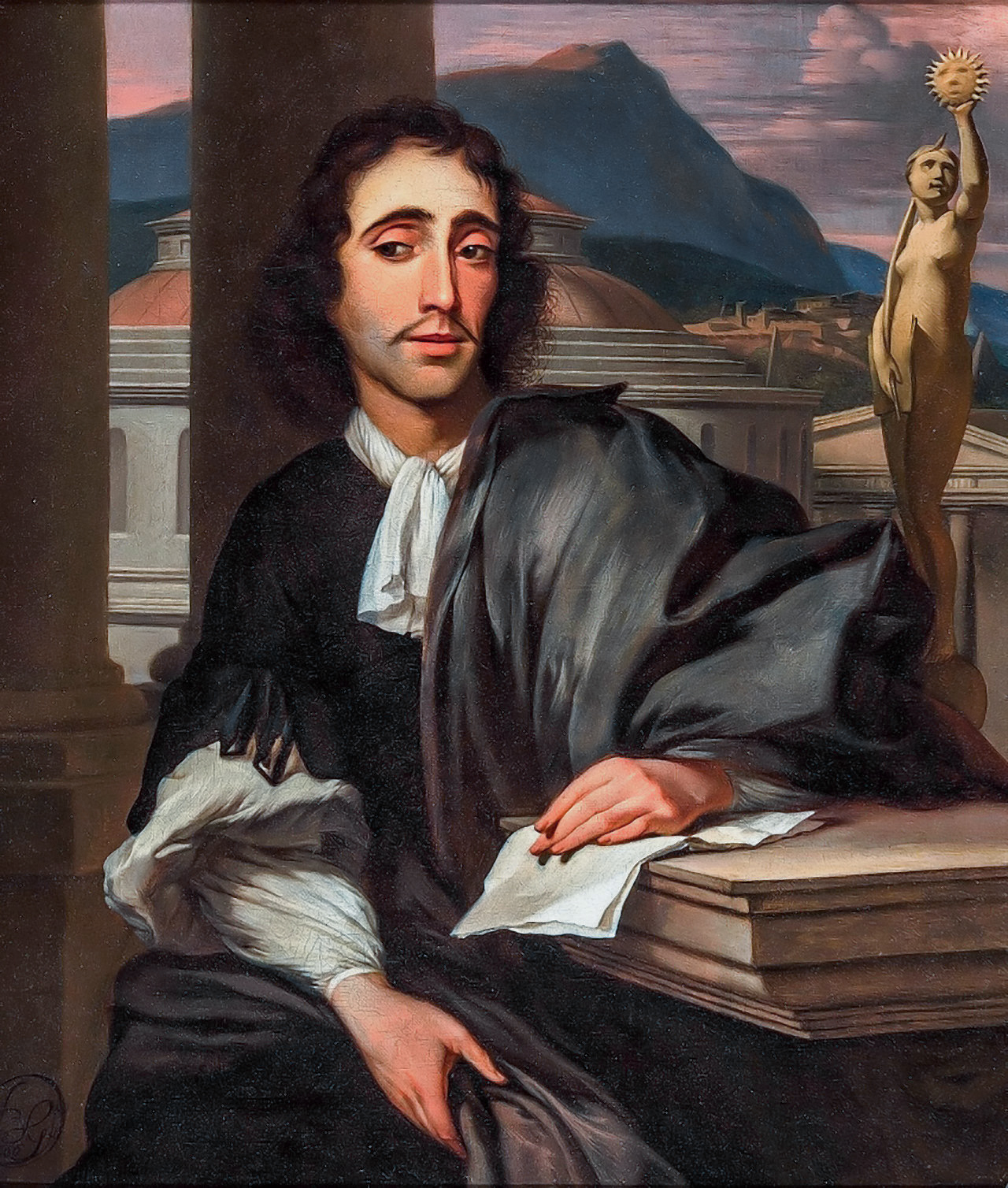
Probable portrait of Spinoza, by Barend Graat, 1666

Spinoza defined God as "a substance consisting of infinite attributes, each of which expresses eternal and infinite essence", and since "no cause or reason" can prevent such a being from existing, it must exist. This is a form of the ontological argument, which is claimed to prove the existence of God, but Spinoza went further in stating that it showed that only God exists. Accordingly, he stated that "Whatever is, is in God, and nothing can exist or be conceived without God". This means that God is identical with the universe, an idea he encapsulated in the phrase "Deus sive Natura" ('God or Nature'), which some have interpreted as atheism or pantheism. God can be known by humans through either the attribute of extension or the attribute of thought, though there are many more such attributes. Thought and extension represent giving complete accounts of the world in mental or physical terms. To this end, he says that "the mind and the body are one and the same thing, which is conceived now under the attribute of thought, now under the attribute of extension".

After stating his proof for God's existence, Spinoza addresses who "God" is. Spinoza believed that God is "the sum of the natural and physical laws of the universe and certainly not an individual entity or creator". Spinoza attempts to prove that God is just the substance of the universe by first stating that substances do not share attributes or essences and then demonstrating that God is a "substance" with an infinite number of attributes, thus the attributes possessed by any other substances must also be possessed by God. Therefore, God is just the sum of all the substances of the universe. God is the only substance in the universe, and everything is a part of God. This view was described by Charles Hartshorne as Classical Pantheism.

Spinoza argues that "things could not have been produced by God in any other way or in any other order than is the case". Therefore, concepts such as 'freedom' and 'chance' have little meaning. This picture of Spinoza's determinism is illuminated in Ethics: "the infant believes that it is by free will that it seeks the breast; the angry boy believes that by free will he wishes vengeance; the timid man thinks it is with free will he seeks flight; the drunkard believes that by a free command of his mind he speaks the things which when sober he wishes he had left unsaid. ... All believe that they speak by a free command of the mind, whilst, in truth, they have no power to restrain the impulse which they have to speak." In his letter to G. H. Schuller (Letter 58), he wrote: "men are conscious of their desire and unaware of the causes by which [their desires] are determined." He also held that knowledge of true causes of passive emotion can transform it into an active emotion, thus anticipating one of the key ideas of Sigmund Freud's psychoanalysis.

According to Eric Schliesser, Spinoza was skeptical regarding the possibility of knowledge of nature and as a consequence at odds with scientists such as Galileo and Huygens.

Arthur Schopenhauer criticized Spinoza's concept of causa sui, regarding it as exemplifying what he considered a fundamental flaw in Spinoza's philosophy: the conflation of the relation between reason and consequence with that between cause and effect.

==== Causality ====
Although the principle of sufficient reason is commonly associated with Gottfried Leibniz, Spinoza employs it more systematically. In Spinoza's philosophical framework, questions concerning why a particular phenomenon exists are always answerable, and these answers are provided in terms of the relevant cause. Spinoza's approach involves first providing an account of a phenomenon, such as goodness or consciousness, to explain it, and then further explaining the phenomenon in terms of itself. For instance, he might argue that consciousness is the degree of power of a mental state.

Spinoza has also been described as an "Epicurean materialist", specifically in reference to his opposition to Cartesian mind–body dualism. This view was held by Epicureans before him, as they believed that atoms with their probabilistic paths were the only substance that existed fundamentally. Spinoza, however, deviated significantly from Epicureans by adhering to strict determinism, much like the Stoics before him, in contrast to the Epicurean belief in the probabilistic path of atoms, which is more in line with contemporary thought on quantum mechanics.

==== The emotions ====
One thing which seems, on the surface, to distinguish Spinoza's view of the emotions from both Descartes' and Hume's pictures of them is that he takes the emotions to be cognitive in some important respect. Jonathan Bennett claims that "Spinoza mainly saw emotions as caused by cognitions. [However] he did not say this clearly enough and sometimes lost sight of it entirely." Spinoza provides several demonstrations which purport to show truths about how human emotions work. The picture presented is, according to Bennett, "unflattering, coloured as it is by universal egoism".

==== Ethical philosophy ====
Spinoza's notion of blessedness figures centrally in his ethical philosophy. Spinoza writes that blessedness (or salvation or freedom), "consists, namely, in a constant and eternal love of God, or in God's love for men." Philosopher Jonathan Bennett interprets this as Spinoza wanting "'blessedness' to stand for the most elevated and desirable state one could possibly be in." Understanding what is meant by "most elevated and desirable state" requires understanding Spinoza's notion of conatus (striving, but not necessarily with any teleological baggage) and that "perfection" refers not to (moral) value, but to completeness. Given that individuals are identified as mere modifications of the infinite Substance, it follows that no individual can ever be fully complete, i.e., perfect, or blessed. Absolute perfection is, in Spinoza's thought, reserved solely for Substance. Nevertheless, modes can attain a lesser form of blessedness, namely, that of pure understanding of oneself as one really is, i.e., as a definite modification of Substance in a certain set of relationships with everything else in the universe. That this is what Spinoza has in mind can be seen at the end of the Ethics, in E5P24 and E5P25, where Spinoza makes two final key moves, unifying the metaphysical, epistemological, and ethical propositions he has developed over the course of the work. In E5P24, he links the understanding of particular things to the understanding of God, or Substance; in E5P25, the conatus of the mind is linked to the third kind of knowledge (Intuition). From here, it is a short step to the connection of Blessedness with the amor dei intellectualis ("intellectual love of God").

=== Tractatus Theologico-Politicus ===
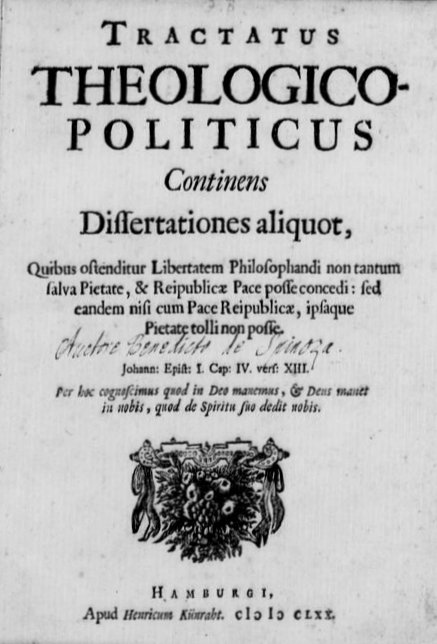
Tractatus Theologico-Politicus, title page

As the Second Anglo-Dutch War raged and Spinoza grew confident in the near completion of his ethical system, he shifted his intellectual focus from writing The Ethics to the urgent complexities of society, religion, war, and politics. The Tractatus Theologico-Politicus (TTP, "Theologico-Political Treatise") explains the lessons of ancient Israelite history, the moral core of Jesus's teachings, and the purpose of God's commandments, all tailored to current Dutch politics. It relies on biblical commentary, interpretation, history, philology, philosophy, legal analysis, and more to make its points.

The work was published in 1670 and immediately caused an uproar across Europe. While Ethics is written for a narrow audience that the masses would not understand, the TTP audience includes theologians such as teachers on university faculties and religious leaders.

=== Tractatus Politicus ===
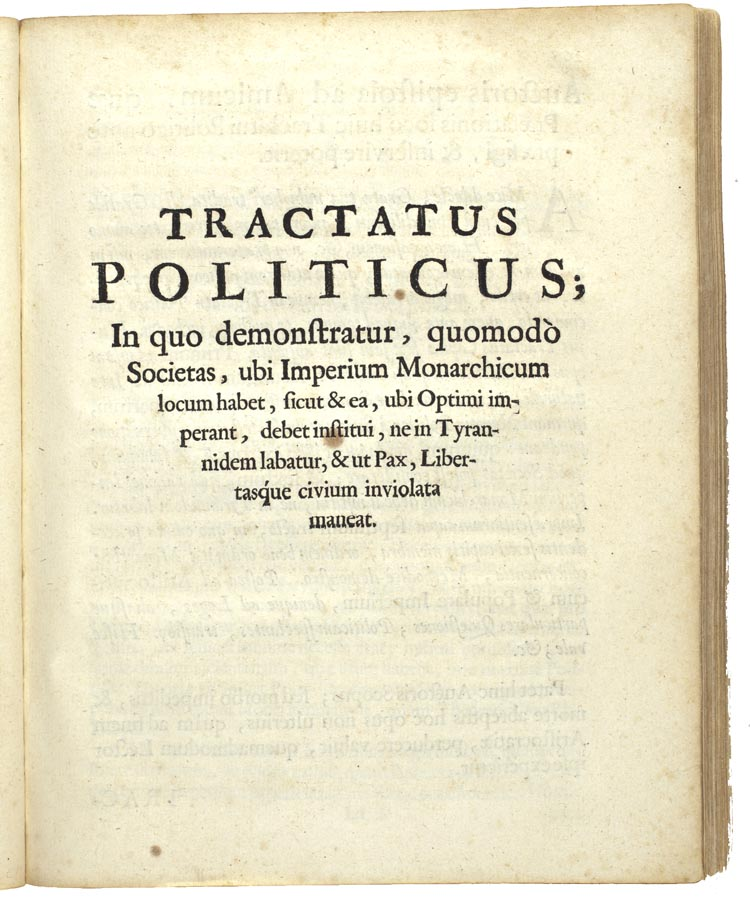
The title page of the Tractatus Politicus in the Opera Posthuma

The unfinished treatise Tractatus Politicus (TP, "Political Treatise") in Latin expounds Spinoza's ideas about forms of government.

Spinoza maintained what would be considered in his context conventional views regarding women's societal role. In his Political Treatise he concludes tersely on the final page that women were naturally subordinate to men—a condition he attributed to inherent differences rather than societal structures, dismissing institutional explanations for their subordination. Biographer Jonathan I. Israel remarked that his views on women were universal for the time.

=== Pantheism, panentheism, atheism ===
Spinoza was considered to be an atheist because he used the word "God" (Deus) to signify a concept that was different from that of traditional Jewish and Christian monotheisms. According to Frank Tilly, "Spinoza expressly denies personality and consciousness to God; he has neither intelligence, feeling, nor will; he does not act according to purpose, but everything follows necessarily from his nature, according to law". Thus, Spinoza's indifferent God differs from the concept of an anthropomorphic, fatherly God who cares about humanity.

In 1785, Friedrich Heinrich Jacobi published a condemnation of Spinoza's pantheism, after Gotthold Ephraim Lessing was thought to have confessed on his deathbed to being a "Spinozist", which was the equivalent in his time of being called an atheist. Jacobi claimed that Spinoza's doctrine was pure materialism, because all Nature and God are said to be nothing but extended substance. This, for Jacobi, was the result of Enlightenment rationalism, and it would finally end in absolute atheism. Moses Mendelssohn disagreed with Jacobi, saying that there is no actual difference between theism and pantheism. The issue became a major intellectual and religious concern for European civilization at the time.

Spinoza's philosophy was attractive to late 18th-century Europeans because it provided an alternative to materialism, atheism, and deism. Three of Spinoza's ideas strongly appealed to them: the unity of all that exists, the regularity of all that happens, and the identity of spirit and nature. By 1879, Spinoza's pantheism was praised by many, but was considered by some to be alarming and dangerously inimical.

Spinoza's "God or Nature" (Deus sive Natura) provided a living, natural God, in contrast to Isaac Newton's first cause argument and the dead mechanism of Julien Offray de La Mettrie's (1709–1751) work, Man a Machine (French: L'homme machine). Coleridge and Shelley saw in Spinoza's philosophy a religion of nature. Novalis called him the "God-intoxicated man". Spinoza inspired the poet Shelley to write his essay "The Necessity of Atheism".

It is a widespread belief that Spinoza equated God with the material universe. He has therefore been called the "prophet", "prince", and most eminent expounder of pantheism. More specifically, in a letter to Henry Oldenburg he states, "As to the view of certain people that I identify God with Nature (taken as a kind of mass or corporeal matter), they are quite mistaken." For Spinoza, the universe (i.e., the cosmos) is a mode under two of the infinitely many attributes, namely those of Thought and Extension, the latter meaning "three-dimensionality (that is, being spatial)". Steven Nadler writes, "The exact shape and size and color of a body are modes (or modifications) of that body; specific thoughts or ideas in a mind are modes of that mind".

According to German philosopher Karl Jaspers (1883–1969), when Spinoza wrote Deus sive Natura ('God or Nature'), Spinoza meant God was natura naturans (lit. 'nature naturing'; i.e., nature doing what nature does), not natura naturata (lit. 'nature natured'; i.e., nature already created). Jaspers believed that Spinoza, in his philosophical system, did not mean to say that God and Nature are interchangeable terms, but rather that God's transcendence was attested by his infinitely many attributes, and that two attributes known by humans, namely Thought and Extension, signified God's immanence. Even God under the attributes of thought and extension cannot be identified strictly with the material world. That world is, of course, "divisible"; it has parts. But Spinoza said, "No attribute of a substance can be truly conceived from which it follows that the substance can be divided", meaning that one cannot conceive an attribute in a way that leads to the division of the substance. He also said, "a substance which is absolutely infinite is indivisible" (Ethics, Part I, Propositions 12 and 13). Following this logic, the material world should be considered as a mode under the attributes of thought and extension. Therefore, according to Jaspers, the pantheist formula "One and All" would apply to Spinoza only if the "One" preserves its transcendence and the "All" were not interpreted as the totality of finite things.

Martial Guéroult (1891–1976) suggested the term panentheism, rather than pantheism, to describe Spinoza's view of the relation between God and the world. The world is not God, but in a strong sense, "in" God. Not only do finite things have God as their cause; they cannot be conceived without God. Likewise, "a panentheistic reading of Spinoza is made by the contemporary philosopher Clare Carlisle in her book Spinoza's Religion". However, American panentheist philosopher Charles Hartshorne (1897–2000) insisted on the term Classical Pantheism to describe Spinoza's view.

According to the Stanford Encyclopedia of Philosophy, Spinoza's God is an "infinite intellect" (Ethics 2p11c): all-knowing (2p3), and capable of loving both himself and humanity, insofar as it is part of his perfection (5p35c). Spinoza postulates that a personal being is one that personal attitudes can be entertained toward. In that light, Spinoza also recommends amor intellectualis dei (the intellectual love of God) as the supreme good for man (5p33). However, the matter is complex. Spinoza's God does not have free will (1p32c1), he does not have purposes or intentions (1 appendix), and Spinoza insists that "neither intellect nor will pertain to the nature of God" (1p17s1). Moreover, while people may love God, they need to remember that God is not a being who could ever love them back. "He who loves God cannot strive that God should love him in return", says Spinoza (5p19).

Steven Nadler suggests that settling the question of Spinoza's atheism or pantheism depends on an analysis of attitudes. If pantheism is associated with religiosity, then Spinoza is not a pantheist, since Spinoza believes that the proper stance to take towards God is not one of reverence or religious awe, but instead one of objective study and reason, since taking the religious stance would leave one open to the possibility of error and superstition. Nadler adds: "Spinoza is not a pantheist—not because he does not identify God merely or at all with ordinary nature, but because pantheism is still a 'theism.' It divinizes nature. This is not Spinoza's project". Instead, Nadler writes:

While religious traditions typically reserve eternity, infinity, and necessary existence for a sublime, awesome God, Spinoza sees them embodied by Nature. These attributes may be what is God-like about Nature, in the sense that they are something shared both by Spinoza's Deus [God] and by some traditional religious notions of God, but they are not sufficient to make Nature divine in any meaningful sense.... Spinoza's philosophy is an atheism. And it is an atheism not simply because Spinoza rejects this kind of God or that kind of God (especially a person-like God who providentially governs his creation). It is an atheism because there is no divinity whatsoever.

=== Other philosophical connections ===
Scholars have frequently noted similarities between Spinoza's philosophy and Eastern philosophical traditions, a comparison traced from Pierre Bayle in the 17th century to contemporary research.

Decades after Spinoza's death, Pierre Bayle in his Historical and Critical Dictionary (1697) linked Spinoza's alleged atheism to the "theology of a Chinese sect" (which he called "Foe Kiao"), based on reports from Jesuit missionaries in East Asia. A century later, Immanuel Kant drew a parallel between Spinoza and Laozi. He grouped both under the label of pantheists, dismissed their ideas as a "monstrous system," and criticized their mystical tendencies.

In 1863, Elijah Benamozegh argued that Kabbalah was the main source of Spinoza's ontology. Recent research by Miquel Beltrán largely supports this thesis, highlighting the influence of Abraham Cohen de Herrera's Kabbalah on Spinoza's metaphysics.

The 19th-century German Sanskritist Theodor Goldstücker observed similarities between Spinoza's religious thought and India's Vedanta tradition. He wrote that Spinoza's ideas were "... so exact a representation of the ideas of the Vedanta, that we might have suspected its founder to have borrowed the fundamental principles of his system from the Hindus, did his biography not satisfy us that he was wholly unacquainted with their doctrines ...". Max Müller likewise equated the Vedantic concept of Brahman with Spinoza's 'Substantia'.

== Legacy ==
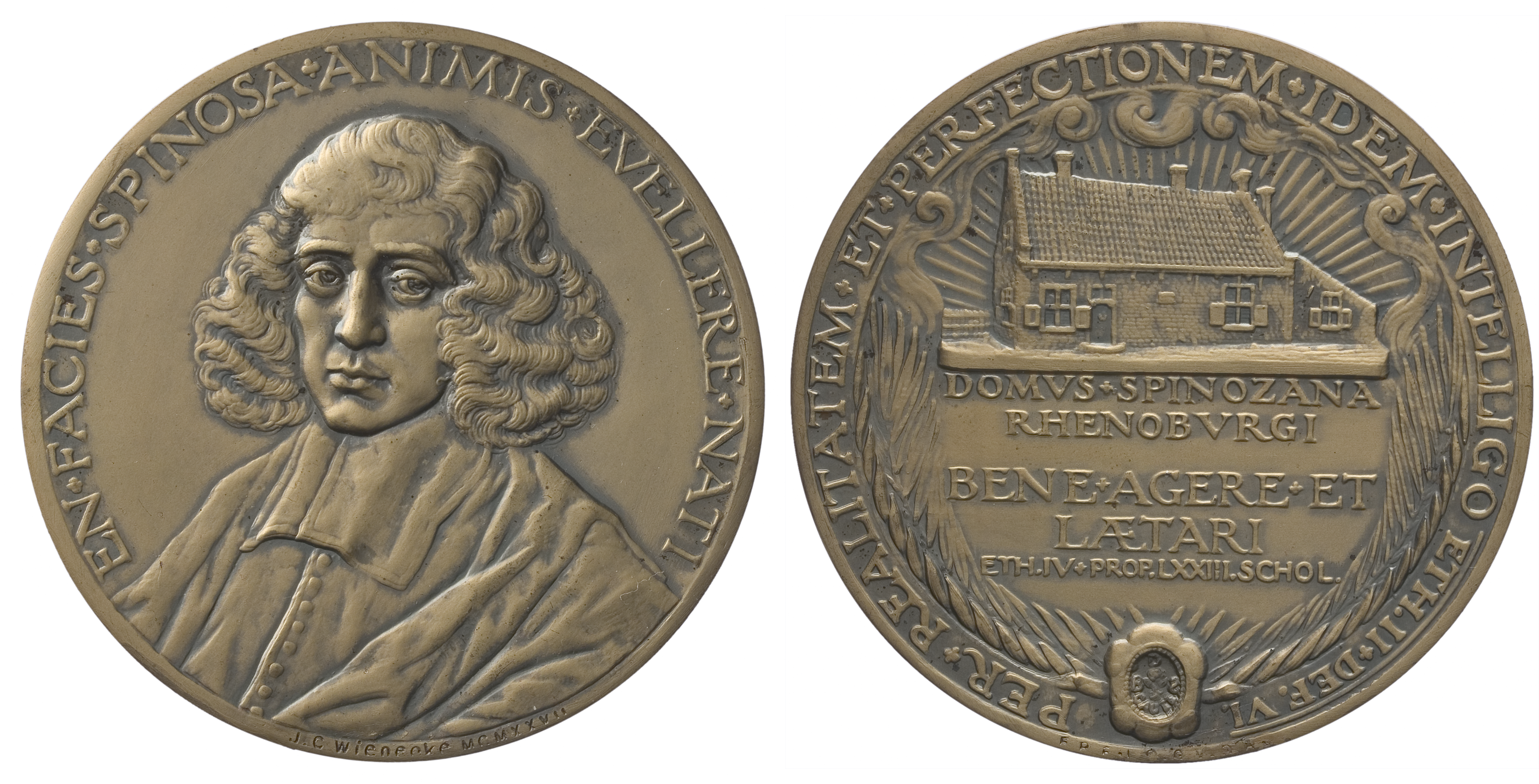
A Dutch commemorative medal issued on the 250th death anniversary of Spinoza, 1927

Spinoza's ideas have had a major impact on intellectual debates from the seventeenth century to the current era. How Spinoza is viewed has gone from the atheistic author of treatises that undermine Judaism and organized religion, to a cultural hero, the first secular Jew. One writer contends that what draws readers to Spinoza today and "makes him perhaps the most beloved philosopher since Socrates, is his confident equanimity". He is not a despairing nihilist, but rather Spinoza says that "blessedness is nothing else but the contentment of spirit, which arises from the intuitive knowledge of God." One of his biographers, Jonathan I. Israel, argues that "No leading figure of the post-1750 later Enlightenment, for example, or the nineteenth century, was engaged with the philosophy of Descartes, Hobbes, Bayle, Locke, or Leibniz, to the degree leading figures such as Lessing, Goethe, Kant, Hegel, Fichte, Schelling, Heine, George Eliot, and Nietzsche, remained preoccupied throughout their creative lives with Spinoza." Hegel (1770–1831) asserts that "The fact is that Spinoza is made a testing-point in modern philosophy, so that it may really be said: You are either a Spinozist or not a philosopher at all."

His expulsion from the Portuguese synagogue in 1656 has stirred debate over the years on whether he is the "first modern Jew". Spinoza influenced discussions of the so-called Jewish question, the examination of the idea of Judaism and the modern, secular Jew. Moses Mendelsohn, Lessing, Heine, and Kant, as well as subsequent thinkers, including Marx, Nietzsche, and Freud were influenced by Spinoza. The changing conception of Spinoza as "the First Modern Jew" has been explicitly explored by various authors. His expulsion has been revisited in the 21st century, with Jewish writers such Berthold Auerbach; Salomon Rubin, who translated Spinoza's Ethics into Hebrew and saw Spinoza as a new Maimonides, penning "a new guide to the perplexed"; Zionist Yosef Klausner, and fiction-writer Isaac Bashevis Singer shaping his image.

In 1886, the young George Santayana published "The Ethical Doctrine of Spinoza", in The Harvard Monthly. Much later, he wrote an introduction to Spinoza's Ethics and "De Intellectus Emendatione". In 1932, Santayana was invited to present an essay (published as "Ultimate Religion") at a meeting at The Hague celebrating the tricentennial of Spinoza's birth. In Santayana's autobiography, he characterized Spinoza as his "master and model" in understanding the naturalistic basis of morality.

Philosopher Ludwig Wittgenstein evoked Spinoza with the title (suggested to him by G. E. Moore) of the English translation of his first philosophical work, Tractatus Logico-Philosophicus, an allusion to Spinoza's Tractatus Theologico-Politicus. Elsewhere, Wittgenstein borrowed the expression sub specie aeternitatis from Spinoza (Notebooks, 1914–16, p. 83). The structure of his Tractatus Logico-Philosophicus does have some structural affinities with Spinoza's Ethics (though, admittedly, not with Spinoza's Tractatus) in erecting complex philosophical arguments upon basic logical propositions and principles. In propositions 6.4311 and 6.45 he alludes to a Spinozian understanding of eternity and interpretation of the religious concept of eternal life, contending, "If by eternity is understood not eternal temporal duration, but timelessness, then he lives eternally who lives in the present." (6.4311) "The contemplation of the world sub specie aeterni is its contemplation as a limited whole." (6.45)

Spinoza's philosophy played an important role in the development of post-war French philosophy. Many of these philosophers "used Spinoza to erect a bulwark against the nominally irrationalist tendencies of phenomenology", which was associated with the dominance of Hegel, Martin Heidegger, and Edmund Husserl in France at that time. Louis Althusser, as well as his colleagues such as Étienne Balibar, saw in Spinoza a philosophy which could lead Marxism out of what they considered to be flaws in its original formulation, particularly its reliance upon Hegel's conception of the dialectic, as well as Spinoza's concept of immanent causality. Antonio Negri, in exile in France for much of this period, also wrote a number of books on Spinoza, most notably The Savage Anomaly (1981) in his own reconfiguration of Italian Autonomia Operaia. Other notable French scholars of Spinoza in this period included Alexandre Matheron, Martial Gueroult, André Tosel, and Pierre Macherey, the last of whom published a widely read and influential five-volume commentary on Spinoza's Ethics, which has been described as "a monument of Spinoza commentary". His philosophical accomplishments and moral character prompted Gilles Deleuze in his doctoral thesis (1968) to name him "the prince of philosophers". Deleuze's interpretation of Spinoza's philosophy was highly influential among French philosophers, especially in restoring to prominence the political dimension of Spinoza's thought. Deleuze published two books on Spinoza and gave numerous lectures on Spinoza in his capacity as a professor at the University of Paris VIII. His own work was deeply influenced by Spinoza's philosophy, particularly the concepts of immanence and univocity. Marilena de Souza Chaui described Deleuze's Expressionism in Philosophy (1968) as a "revolutionary work for its discovery of expression as a central concept in Spinoza's philosophy."

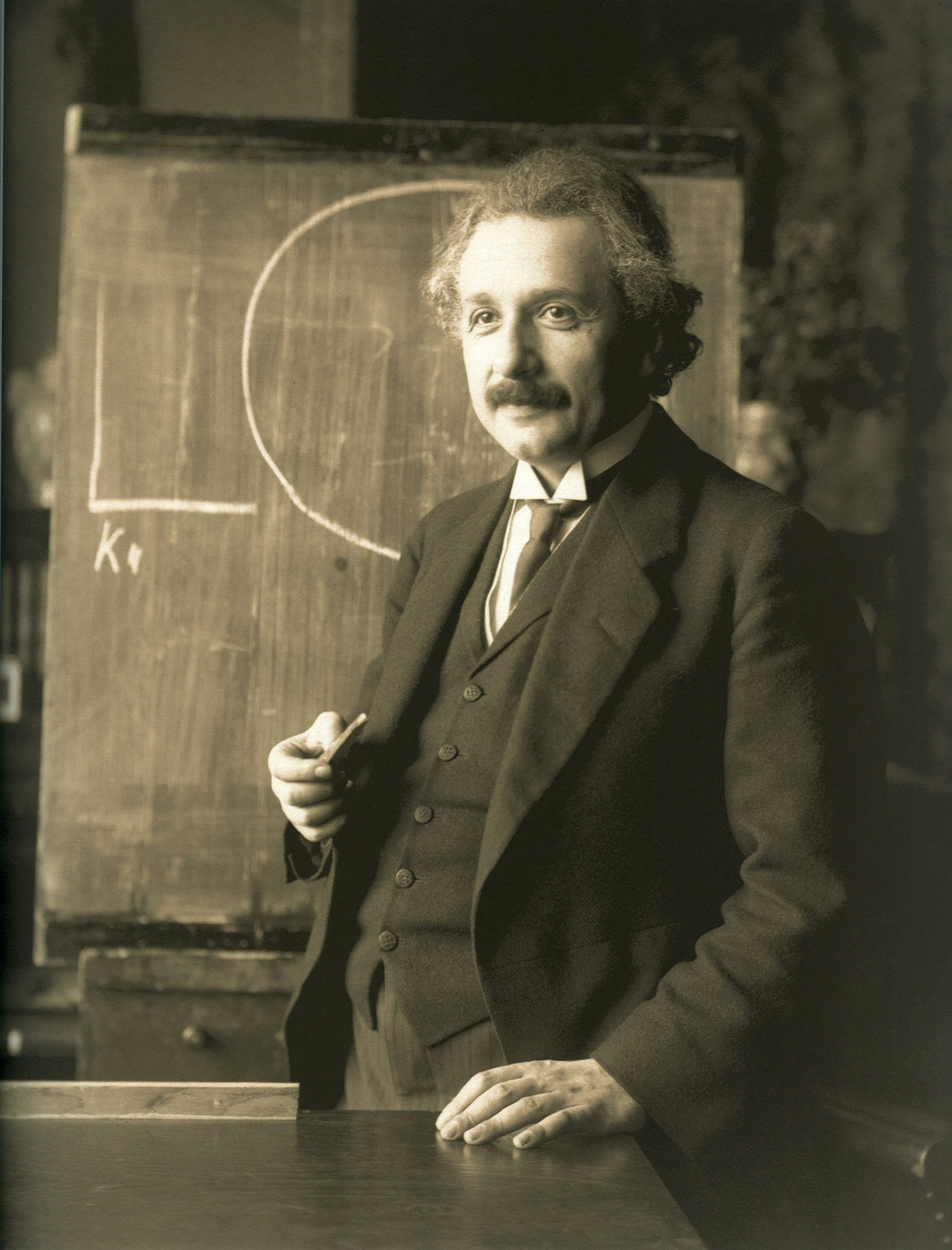
Einstein 1921

Albert Einstein named Spinoza as the philosopher who exerted the most influence on his world view (Weltanschauung). Spinoza equated God (infinite substance) with Nature, consistent with Einstein's belief in an impersonal deity. In 1929, Einstein was asked in a telegram by Rabbi Herbert S. Goldstein whether he believed in God. Einstein responded by telegram: "I believe in Spinoza's God who reveals himself in the orderly harmony of what exists, not in a God who concerns himself with the fates and actions of human beings." Einstein wrote the preface to a biography of Spinoza, published in 1946.

Leo Strauss dedicated his first book, Spinoza's Critique of Religion, to an examination of his ideas. Strauss identified Spinoza as part of the tradition of Enlightenment rationalism that eventually produced Modernity. Moreover, he identifies Spinoza and his works as the beginning of Jewish Modernity. More recently Jonathan Israel argued that, from 1650 to 1750, Spinoza was "the chief challenger of the fundamentals of revealed religion, received ideas, tradition, morality, and what was everywhere regarded, in absolutist and non-absolutist states alike, as divinely constituted political authority."

Spinoza is an important historical figure in the Netherlands, where his portrait was featured prominently on the Dutch 1000-guilder banknote, legal tender until the euro was introduced in 2002. The highest and most prestigious scientific award of the Netherlands is named the Spinoza Prize (Spinozaprijs). Spinoza was included in a 50-theme canon that attempts to summarise the history of the Netherlands. In 2014 a copy of Spinoza's Tractatus Theologico-Politicus was presented to the Chair of the Dutch Parliament, and shares a shelf with the Bible and the Quran.

=== Modern era ===
==== Spinoza and Zionism ====
In the Tractatus Theologico-Politicus Spinoza said, in passing, about the Jews that "were it not that the fundamental principles of their religion discourage manliness, I would not hesitate to believe that they will one day, given the opportunity, ... establish once more their independent state, and that God will again choose them". This comment, and Spinoza's general emphasis on the political-national aspects of Judaism, had inspired some of the secular forerunners of Zionism. (Note: e.g. Moses Hess, Leon Pinsker, George Elliot.) Some Zionist leaders even described Spinoza as the first secular proto-Zionist. (Note: Most notably David Ben-Gurion. See Novak 2015: "For Ben-Gurion and others like him, Spinoza was the prototype of the new kind of Jew they thought themselves to be, and the new kind of Jew they wanted Israeli Jews, especially, to become. The question is whether or not Spinoza is really the kind of precedent a secular Zionist like Ben-Gurion was hopefully looking for.") Some scholars agree (to various degrees) with the characterization of Spinoza as proto-Zionist, while other scholars are critical of it.

==== Reconsideration of Spinoza's expulsion ====
There has been a renewed debate in modern times about Spinoza's excommunication among Israeli politicians, rabbis and Jewish press, with many calling for the cherem to be reversed. A conference was organized at the YIVO Institute for Jewish Research in New York entitled "From Heretic to Hero: A Symposium on the Impact of Baruch Spinoza on the 350th Anniversary of His Excommunication, 1656–2006". Presenters included Steven Nadler, Jonathan I. Israel, Steven B. Smith, and Daniel B. Schwartz. There have been calls for Spinoza's cherem to be rescinded, but it can be done only by the congregation that issued it, and the chief rabbi of that community, (Note: Portugees-Israëlietische Gemeente te Amsterdam (Portuguese-Israelite commune of Amsterdam)) Haham Pinchas Toledano, declined to do so, citing Spinoza's "preposterous ideas, where he was tearing apart the very fundamentals of our religion". The Amsterdam Jewish community organised a symposium in December 2015 to discuss lifting the cherem, inviting scholars from around the world to form an advisory committee at the meeting. However, the rabbi of the congregation ruled that it should hold, on the basis that he had no greater wisdom than his predecessors, and that Spinoza's views had not become less problematic over time.

==== Memory and memorials ====
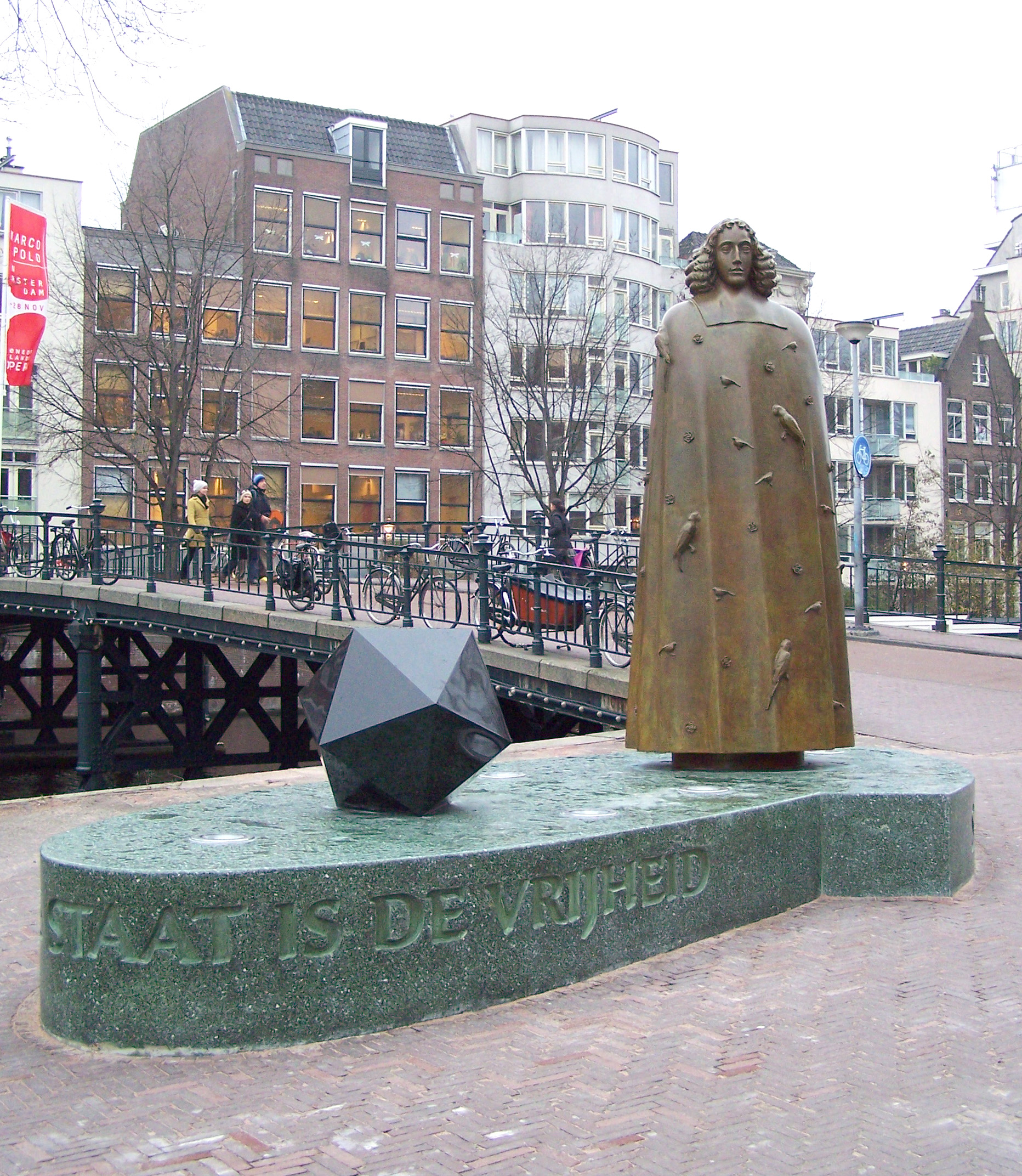
Statue of Spinoza by Nicolas Dings in Zwanenburgwal, Amsterdam with the inscription "The objective of the state is freedom" (quote from Tractatus Theologico-Politicus)

- Spinoza Lyceum, a high school in Amsterdam South was named after Spinoza. There is also a three-metre-tall marble statue of him on the grounds of the school carved by Hildo Krop.
- The Spinoza Havurah (a Humanistic Jewish community) was named in Spinoza's honor.
- The Spinoza Foundation Monument has a statue of Spinoza located in front of the Amsterdam City Hall (at Zwanenburgwal) It was created by Dutch sculptor Nicolas Dings and was erected in 2008.

== In popular culture ==
Spinoza's life and work have been the subject of interest for several writers. For example, this influence was considerably early in German literature, where Goethe makes a glowing mention of the philosopher in his memoirs, highlighting the positive influence of the Ethics in his personal life. The same thing happened in the case of his compatriot, the poet Heine, who is also lavish in praise for Spinoza on his On the History of Religion and Philosophy in Germany (1834).

In the following century, the Argentinian Jorge Luis Borges famously wrote two sonnets in his honor ("Spinoza" in El otro, el mismo, 1964; and "Baruch Spinoza" in La moneda de hierro, 1976), and several direct references to Spinoza's philosophy can be found in this writer's work. Also in Argentina and previously to Borges, the Ukrainian-born Jewish intellectual Alberto Gerchunoff wrote a novella about philosopher's early sentimental life, Los amores de Baruj [sic] Spinoza (lit. "The loves of Baruj Spinoza", 1932), recreating a supposed affair or romantic interest with Clara Maria van den Enden, daughter of his Latin teacher and philosophical preceptor, Franciscus.

That is not the only work of fiction where the philosopher appears as the main character. In 1837 the German writer Berthold Auerbach dedicated to him the first novel in his series on Jewish history, translated into English in 1882 (Spinoza: A Novel). (Note: See complete text on Wikisource.) Some other novels of biographical nature have appeared more recently, such as The Spinoza Problem (2012; a parallel story between the philosopher's formative years, and the fascination that his work had on the Nazi leader Alfred Rosenberg) by psychiatrist Irvin D. Yalom, or O Segredo de Espinosa (lit. "The Secret of Spinoza", 2023) by Portuguese journalist José Rodrigues dos Santos. Spinoza also appears in the first novel of the Argentinian activist Andres Spokoiny, El impío (lit. "The Impious", 2021), about the marrano physician and philosopher Juan de Prado, a key influence in Spinoza's biography.

Spinoza's Ethics play a central role in Isaac Bashevis Singer's short story, The Spinoza of Market Street. The main character, Dr. Nahum Fischelson, studies the book religiously, and holds Spinoza in divine esteem.

Spinoza's writings feature prominently in Paul Schrader's film The Basics of Philosophy, which focuses on a professor's struggles with the moral question of whether one can ever truly change. Actor Karl Glusman portrays Spinoza when the protagonist imagines meeting him in person.

== Works ==
=== Original editions ===
- c. 1660. Korte Verhandeling van God, de mensch en deszelvs welstand (unpublished until the 19th century; A Short Treatise on God, Man and His Well-Being; translated by A. Wolf. London, Adam and Charles Black Eds., 1910).
- 1662. Tractatus de Intellectus Emendatione (On the Improvement of the Understanding) (unfinished).
- 1663. Principia philosophiae cartesianae (The Principles of Cartesian Philosophy, also contains Metaphysical Thoughts/Cogitata Metaphisica; translated by Samuel Shirley, with an Introduction and Notes by Steven Barbone and Lee Rice, Indianapolis, 1998).
- 1670. Tractatus Theologico-Politicus (A Theologico-Political Treatise), TTP, published anonymously in his lifetime with a false place of publication.
- 1675–76. Tractatus Politicus (Political Treatise), TP (unfinished at his death), published posthumously.
- 1677. Ethica Ordine Geometrico Demonstrata (The Ethics, finished 1674, but published posthumously, title added posthumously).
- 1677. Compendium grammatices linguae hebraeae (Hebrew Grammar, unfinished; translated with introduction by M. J. Bloom, London, 1963).
- 1677. Epistolae (The Letters, translated by Samuel Shirley, with an Introduction and Notes by S. Barbone, L. Rice and J. Adler, Indianapolis, 1995).
- Last four were originally collected and published by Spinoza's friends briefly later his death, in: B. d. S. Opera Posthuma, Quorum series post Praefationem exhibetur. (Amsterdam: Jan Rieuwertsz, 1677; both publisher and place were purposely omitted). Simultaneously, Rieuwertsz also published a Dutch translation by Jan Hendriksz Glazemaker (who some years later translated the TTP): De Nagelate Schriften van B. d. S., without the Hebrew Grammar.

=== Contemporary editions ===
- Morgan, Michael L., ed. (2002). Spinoza: Complete Works. Translated by Shirley, Samuel (1st ed.). Indianapolis: Hackett Publishing. p. 992. ISBN 978-0-87220-620-5. OCLC 49775415.
- Edwin Curley (ed.), 1985, 2016. The Collected Works of Spinoza (two volumes), Princeton: Princeton University Press. (Excludes the Compendium grammatices linguae hebraeae).
- Spruit, Leen and Pina Totaro, 2011. The Vatican Manuscript of Spinoza's Ethica, Leiden: Brill. This is the only known surviving manuscript of Spinoza's Ethics, discovered in the Vatican archive and published in a bilingual Latin-English edition.

== See also ==
- History of the Jews in the Netherlands
- List of Epistolae (Letters) of Spinoza
- Naturalistic Pantheism
