= Johannes van Vloten =

Dutch scholar (1818–1883)

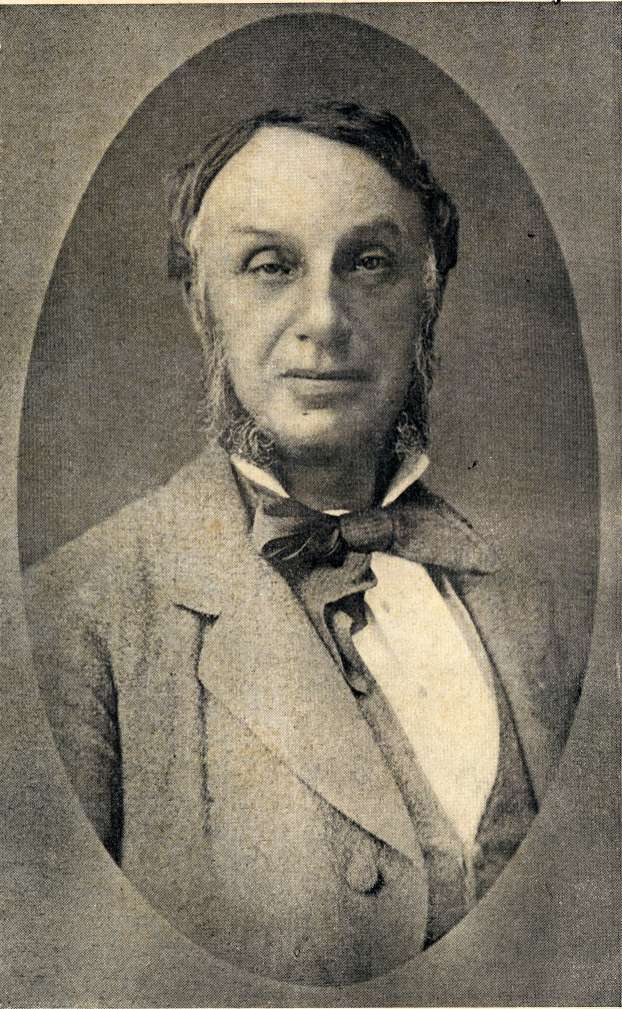

Johannes van Vloten (January 18, 1818 – September 21, 1883) was a Dutch scholar, literary historian and philosopher. He is known as a rediscoverer of Spinoza's work and a freethinker in his tradition, with a great deal of involvement in all kinds of social issues. Van Vloten was one of the founders of modern humanism.

He was born in to the family of a predikant, Together with his family in 1835 he moved to Leiden. van Vloten Studied theology, literature and languagesat the University of Leiden. He was one of the first representatives of liberal philosophy and liberalism in Dutch literary criticism. In his work "Over de leer der hervormde kerk" (1849), he opposed the doctrines of the Reformed Church, spoke out in support of the labor movement and helping the poor.

After graduating from the University, he became a teacher of French and history at a gymnasium in Rotterdam in 1862, then he was engaged in editorial activity for eight years. In 1854 he became professor of Dutch language and literature at the atheneum in Deventer, in 1865 he began teaching in parallel in Groningen, but in 1867 he was dismissed from the ateneum because of his anti-religious position, after which he settled in Bloemendal in the vicinity of Haarlem and until the end of his life was engaged in writing scientific papers, having no permanent income. From 1865 to 1881 he was editor of the journal De Levensbode. He was close to progressive and liberal figures of the time such as Everhardus Johannes Potgieter and Multatuli.

In 1878 he made a trip to Scandinavia with his family, and a second trip in 1881. Van Vloten died in Haarlem in 1883.

== Works ==
Johannes van Vloten's literary work covers a wide spectrum. His works on Dutch history received great recognition. This is followed by the biographies Paschier de Fyne naar zijn leven en geschriften (Herzogbusch 1853) and Baruch d'Espinoza (Amsterdam 1852), which are important for Dutch cultural history. van Vloten made a valuable contribution to Dutch literature through text editions and literary-historical works.

=== Selected publications ===
- Leidens belegering en ontzet. Leiden 1854.
- Nederlands opstand tegen Spanje. 3 Bände, Haarlem und Schiedam 1858-72.
- Middelburgs beleg en overgang. Middelburg 1874.
- Baruch d’Espinoza. Amsterdam 1852; 2. Aufl. Schiedam 1871.
- Beknopte geschiedenis der nederlandsche letteren. 2. Aufl. Tiel 1871.
- Leven en werken van Willem en Onno Zwier van Haren. Deventer 1871.
- Nederlands schilderkunst. 1873.
- Elisabeth Wolff. Haarlem 1880.
- Nederlandsche aesthetika. 3. Aufl. 1882.
