= Johannes Bouwmeester =

Dutch philosopher and physician

Johannes Bouwmeester (4 November 1634 – buried 22 October 1680) was a Dutch physician, philosopher, and a founding member of the literary society Nil volentibus arduum. He enrolled at Leiden University in 1651, and in 1658, graduated there in medicine. He was a close friend of Lodewijk Meyer, co-founder of Nil volentibus arduum, and acquainted with the philosophers Benedictus de Spinoza and Adriaen Koerbagh. His father, Claes Bouwmeester, was tailor by trade, and several family members were builders of musical instruments. He was born in Amsterdam.

At least one letter by Spinoza to Bouwmeester (no. 37) is known, and another letter to an anonymous correspondent addressed to him (no. 28), although this is generally inaccurately stated as a fact in most editions of Spinoza's correspondence. In 1663 he wrote a Latin poem for Spinoza's Renati Descartes principia philosophiae and he is also believed to be the author of the small poem under the engraved portrait of Spinoza found in some editions of the Opera posthuma (1677). In the second half of the 1660s, he traveled to Italy, where on 30 September 1667 he enrolled in law at the University of Padua. In 1672, he translated the philosophical novel Het leeven van Hai Ebn Yokdhan, based on an earlier Latin translation by Edward Pococke, and published in Amsterdam by Jan Rieuwertsz. Bouwmeester was also involved in the publication of Spinoza's works.
