= Willem van Blijenbergh =

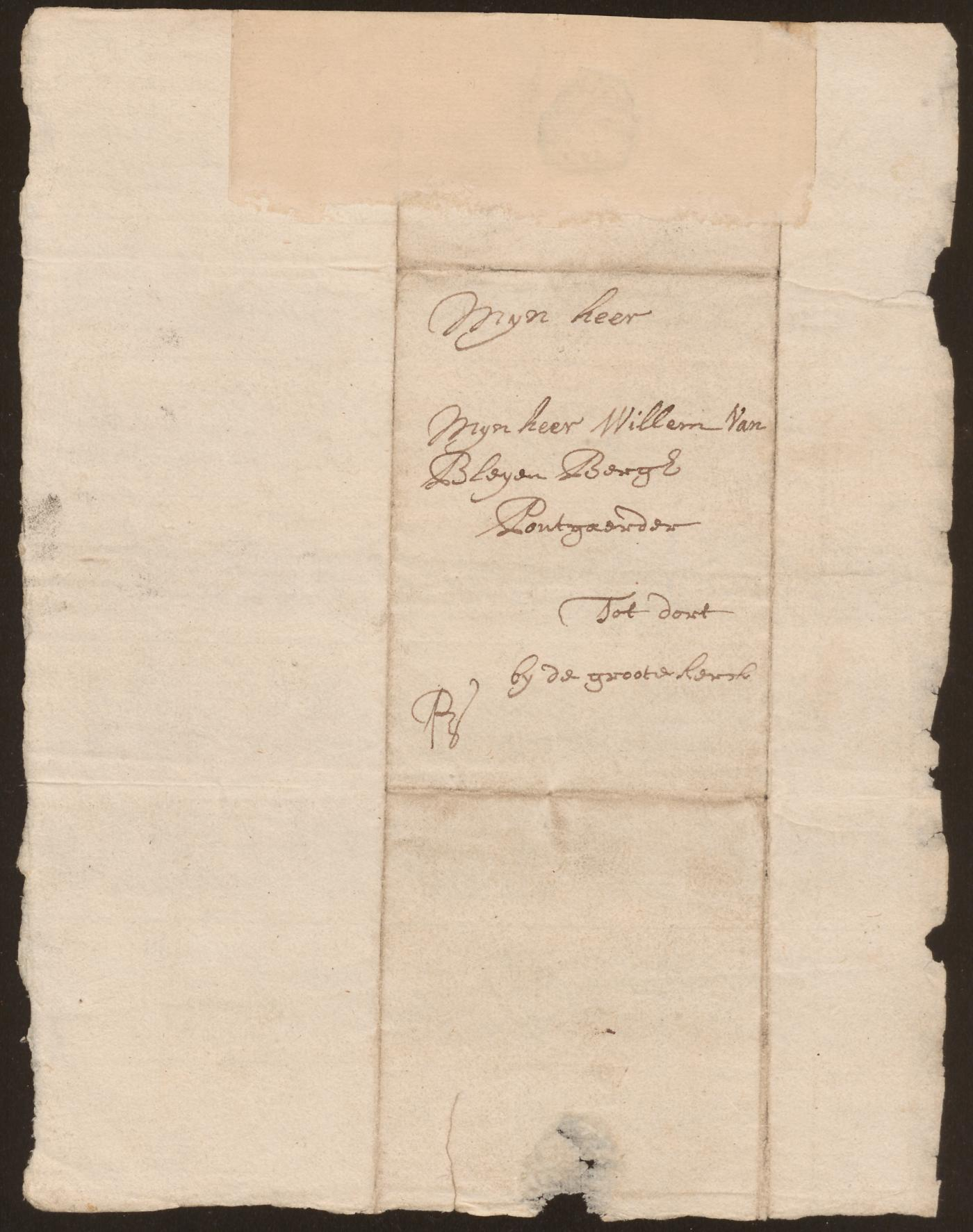
Letter by Benedictus de Spinoza to Willem van Blijenbergh, cover, 1665.

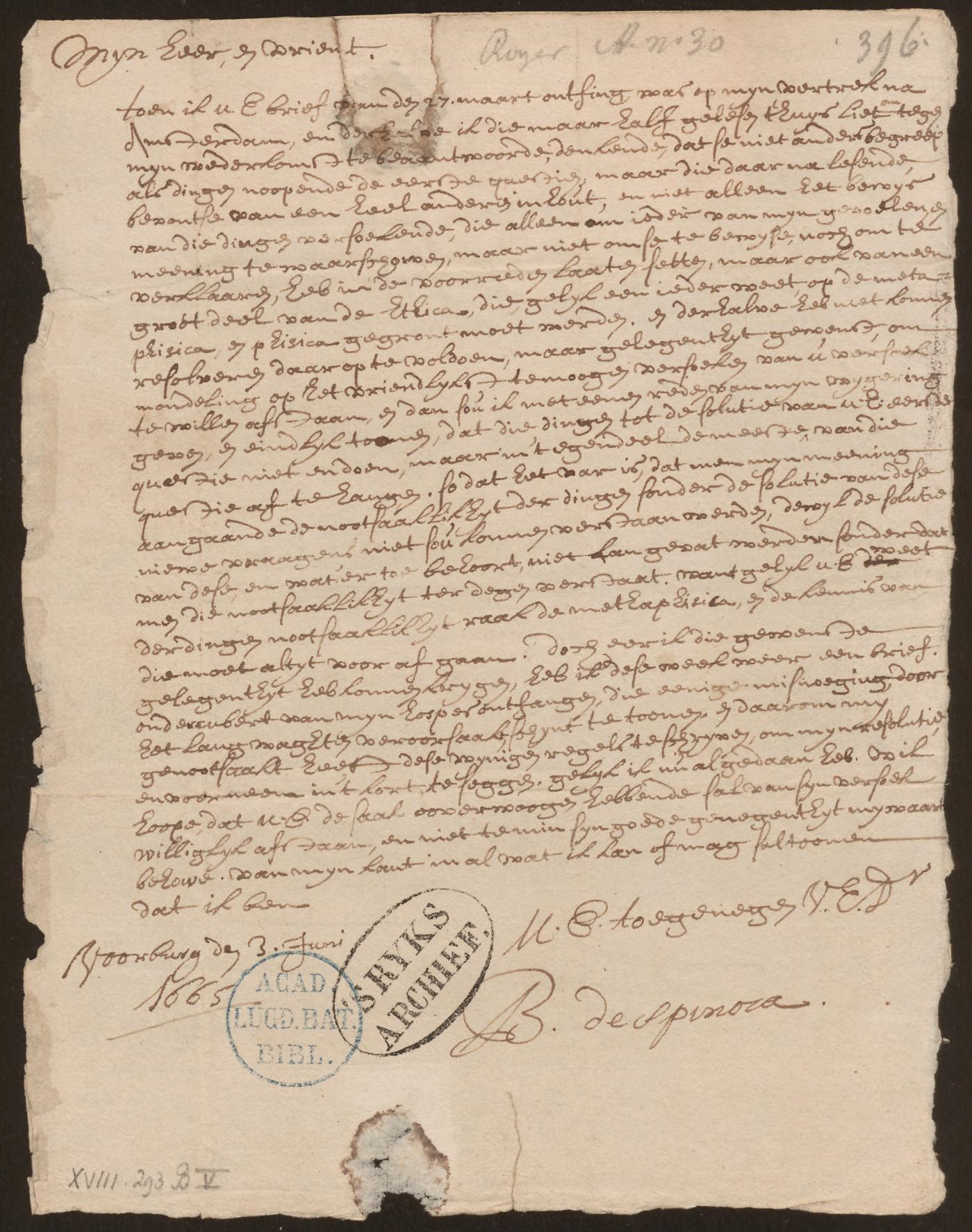
Letter by Benedictus de Spinoza to Willem van Blijenbergh, 1665.

Willem van Blijenbergh (1632–1696) was a Dutch grain broker and amateur Calvinist theologian. He was born and lived in Dordrecht. He engaged in philosophical correspondence with Baruch Spinoza regarding the problem of evil. Their correspondence consisted of four letters each, written between December 1664 to June 1665. Blijenbergh visited Spinoza at his home in June, after which their correspondence ended.

== Works ==
- De kennisse Gods en gods-dienst beweert tegen d'uitvluchten der atheisten, in welcke ... getoont wert dat God een gods-dienst ingeschapen en geopenbaert heeft ... en dat de Christelijcke gods-dienst niet alleen met Gods geopenbaerde Gods-dienst over-een-komt maar oock met ons ingeschapen reden, Tot Leyden : By Daniel en Abraham Gaasbeeck ..., 1663
- Sociniaensche Ziel onder een Mennonitisch Kleedt. Ofte Antwoorde op duplijcke van een ongenoemt Sociniaen, tegens de verdedighde Aenteykeningen van Corn. Gentman. In welke gehandelt wert van Gods Voorwetenschap, vande Voorsienigheydt Gods, van de overtredinge Adams ..., Utrecht, Dreunen, Meinardus van, 1666
- De waerheyt van de Christelijcke godts-dienst en de authoriteyt der H. Schriften, beweert tegen de argumenten der ongodtsdienstige, of een wederlegginge van dat godt-lasterlijcke boeck, genoemt Tractatus theologico-politicus ..., Leyden, D. van Gaesbeeck, 1674
- Wederlegging van de ""Ethica" of Zede-kunst" van Benedictus de Spinosa, voornamentlijk omtrent het wesen ende de natuur van god en van onse ziel, Dordrecht : By de weduwe van Jasper en by Dirck Goris, 1682
- Klaare en beknopte verhandeling van de natuur en werkinge der menschelijke zielen, engelen en duivelen, Vervat in gewisselde brieven tusschen de heer Willem van Blyenbergh, en Willem Deurhoff, t'Amsterdam, : by Jan ten Hoorn, boekverkooper #over het Oude Heeren Logement#, 1692
