= 1660 in literature =

This article contains information about the literary events and publications of 1660.

== Events ==
- January 11 – Samuel Pepys starts his diary, still using the Old Style date of 1 January.
- February/March – John Rhodes reopens the old Cockpit Theatre in London, forms a company of young actors and begins to stage plays. His production of Pericles will be the first Shakespearean performance of the Restoration era; Thomas Betterton makes his stage debut in the title rôle.
- May – The English Restoration brings a host of Royalist exiles back to England, Richard Baxter among them, and many panegyrics are produced to commemorate the event.
- June – A warrant is issued for the arrest of the anti-monarchist John Milton, who is forced into hiding, whilst his writings are burned.
- August 21 – The newly restored King Charles II of England issues a royal grant for two theatre companies: a King's Company under his own patronage, led by Thomas Killigrew, and a Duke's Company under the patronage of his brother, the Duke of York and future King James II, led by Sir William Davenant. On November 8, the King's Company moves from the old Red Bull Theatre to the new Vere St. Theatre, and in the same month the Duke's Company begins performing at the Salisbury Court Theatre.
- September 5 – Roger Boyle receives the title of Earl of Orrery.
- October 14 – Blaise Pascal's Lettres Provinciales is burned as a heretical work on the orders of King Louis XIV of France.
- October – John Milton is arrested and imprisoned.
- December – John Milton is released from prison, two weeks after his brother Christopher is appointed a judge.
- December 8 – The first English actress to appear on the professional stage in England in a non-singing rôle, as Desdemona in Othello, is variously considered to be Margaret Hughes, Anne Marshall or Katherine Corey.
- unknown dates
  - The Royalist poet Robert Herrick returns to his parish in Devon after the English Restoration.
  - The Klencke Atlas is commissioned by Dutch merchants as a gift to King Charles II of England; at 1.75 metres (5 feet 9 inches) tall it is one of the world's largest books.
  - Danish writer Birgitte Thott is given permission by King Frederick III of Denmark to receive an annual grant from the Soro Academy to pursue her studies, expand her library, and research into language.

== New books ==
=== Prose ===
- Sarah Blackborow – The Just and Equall Ballance Discovered
- Francisco Manuel de Melo – Epanáphoras de varia historia portuguesa
- Richard Flecknoe – Heroick Portraits
- George Mackenzie – Aretina (the first Scottish novel)
- John Milton – The Ready and Easy Way to Establish a Free Commonwealth
- Thomas Plowden, S.J. (translated) – The Learned Man Defended and Reform'd (Daniello Bartoli's L'huomo di lettere)
- Madeleine de Scudéry – Clélie
- Jeremy Taylor – Ductor Dubitantium, or the Rule of Conscience
- Thieleman J. van Braght – De Martelaersspiegel

=== Drama ===
- Anonymous (misattributed to James Shirley) – Andromana (published)
  - Cromwell's Conspiracy
  - (misattributed to Beaumont and Fletcher) – The Faithful Friends (registered)
- Thomas Ford – Love's Labyrinth, or the Royal Shepherdess (published)
- William Lower – The Amorous Fantasm (adapted from Philippe Quinault's Le Fantôme Amoreux)
- John Tatham
  - London's Glory (staged at the Guildhall)
  - The Rump (published)
- Pedro Calderón de la Barca – Celos aun del aire matan
- Molière – Sganarelle, ou Le Cocu imaginaire

=== Poetry ===
- Rachel Jevon – Exultationis Carmen
- John Dryden – Astraea Redux
- Robert Wild – Iter Boreale. Attempting Something upon the Successful and Matchless March of the Lord General George Monk from Scotland to London

== Births ==
- January – Hippolyte Hélyot, French church historian (died 1716)
- February 12 – Thomas Southerne, Irish dramatist (died 1749)
- March 28 – Arnold Houbraken, Dutch writer and painter (died 1719)
- May or earlier – Anne Killigrew, English poet and painter (died 1685)
- Unknown date – Edward Lhuyd, Welsh naturalist and antiquary (died 1709)
- probable
  - Daniel Defoe, English novelist and travel writer (died 1731)
  - Liu Zhi (劉智), Chinese Muslim scholar (died c. 1739)

== Deaths ==
- April 30 – Petrus Scriverius, Dutch scholar and writer (born 1576)
- August 31 – Johann Freinsheim, German critic (born 1608)
- October 6 – Paul Scarron, French dramatist and novelist (born c. 1610)
- December 31 – Thomas Powell, Welsh writer and cleric (born c. 1608)
- Unknown date – Sir Thomas Urquhart, Scottish writer and translator (born 1611)
