= Archconfraternity =

Type of Catholic confraternity within which other confraternities are aggregated

An archconfraternity (Spanish: archicofradía) is a Catholic confraternity, empowered to aggregate or affiliate other confraternities of the same nature, and to impart to them its benefits and privileges.

== History ==
In 1569, Charles Borromeo started archconfraternities in Milan as a way to standardize the practice of the various penitent confraternities.

== Status and operation ==
Canonical erection is the approval of the proper ecclesiastical authority which gives the organization a legal existence. Archconfraternities do not erect confraternities; they merely aggregate them. It ordinarily belongs to the bishop of the diocese to erect confraternities. In the case, however, of many confraternities and archconfraternities, the power of erection is vested in the heads of certain religious orders. Sometimes the privileges of these heads of orders are imparted to bishops. The vicar-general may not erect confraternities unless he has been expressly delegated for the purpose by his bishop.

Aggregation, or affiliation, as it is also called, may be made by those only who have received from the Holy See express powers for that purpose. They must make use of a prescribed formula. In the same church only one confraternity of the same name and purpose may be aggregated. The consent of the bishop must be given in writing.

In the case of religious orders aggregating their own confraternities in their own churches, the consent of the bishop given for the erection of the house or church of the order is sufficient. The bishop must approve, but may modify the practices and regulations of the confraternity to be aggregated, except those to which the indulgences have been expressly attached. Only those indulgences are imparted by aggregation which have been conceded with that provision.

Only the general process of conducting the aggregation is given. If it pertains to the bishop to erect the confraternity, then the pastor of a church or the superior of a religious house petitions him for canonical erection,. If the erection pertains to the head of a religious order, then the bishop's consent to the aggregation is required.

== Examples ==
Examples of archconfraternities include the following.

- Archconfraternity of the Most Precious Blood
- Archconfraternity of the Holy Family
- Archconfraternity of St. Stephen
- Archconfraternity of Holy Agony
- Archconfraternity of the Gonfalone - dissolved 1890
- Archconfraternity of the Holy Infancy
- Archconfraternity of the Divine Child Jesus
- Archconfraternity of Our Lady of Consolation
- Archconfraternity of the Cord of Saint Francis
- Archconfraternity of the Cord of Saint Joseph
- Confraternity of Christian Doctrine
- Bona Mors Confraternity
- Archconfraternity of the Scapular of St. Michael

== Present day ==
- The Archconfraternity of the Misericordia was founded around 1244 in Florence, Italy. It is one of the oldest private voluntary institutions in the world still active since its foundation. The Misericordia continues to offer a network of free services for needy people: transport to hospitals, home healthcare, lending health equipment, and many others.
- The Archconfraternity of the Holy Face was erected in Tours, France in 1885. It is based at the Centre Spirituel de la Sainte Face in Tours, run by the Dominican Fathers of the French Province.
- Archconfraternity of Christian Mothers: The Confraternity of Christian Mothers began in Lille, France in 1850. German Capuchins brought it to the United States, where in 1881, it was canonically erected at Pittsburgh, Pennsylvania. Later it was raised to the rank of an Archconfraternity. The Capuchins serve as directors.

== See also ==
- Confraternity of the Rosary
- Sodality of the Blessed Virgin
