= Cupid's Revenge =

Play by Francis Beaumont and John Fletcher

Cupid's Revenge is a Jacobean tragedy written by Francis Beaumont and John Fletcher. It was a popular success that influenced subsequent works by other authors.

== Date and performance ==
The play's date of authorship is uncertain; some scholars have dated it to as early as 1607–8, based on allusions and references to contemporary events, and on that basis have considered it the earliest collaborative effort by Fletcher and Beaumont. Others have preferred a date c. 1611, due to the cluster of evidence for the play in that era. The play was performed at Court three times between January 1612 and February 1613 by the Children of the Revels. The popular play was revived a decade later and acted again at Court on 28 December 1624 by the Queen of Bohemia's Men; by 1639 it was in the repertory of Beeston's Boys.

== Publication ==
The play was entered into the Stationers' Register on 24 April 1615, and first published later that year in a quarto printed by Thomas Creede for the bookseller Josias Harrison. A second quarto was issued in 1630 by Thomas Jones, and a third quarto followed in 1635. Like many of the previously published plays in the Beaumont-Fletcher canon, Cupid's Revenge was not included in the first Beaumont and Fletcher folio of 1647, but again, like other plays in this category, it was part of the second folio of 1679.

== Authorship ==
The title page of Q1 attributes the play to John Fletcher alone, while the Q2 title page corrects this to Beaumont and Fletcher, an attribution that is universally accepted among modern scholars and critics. Individual nineteenth-century critics also linked, or attempted to link, Nathan Field, Robert Daborne, and/or Philip Massinger to the play, though these suggestions have failed to convince other scholars through lack of evidence. Cyrus Hoy, in his classic study of authorship problems in the canon of Fletcher and his collaborators, observed that the clear dichotomy between the styles of Fletcher and Beaumont that is typical of their plays is less evident in Cupid's Revenge, apparently due to a revision by Beaumont; yet based on the available evidence he assigned shares to the two authors this way:

Beaumont – Act I, scenes 1 and 3; II, 1-2 and 4-5; III, 1-2; IV, 1 and 5; V, 1;
Fletcher – Act I, scenes 2 and 4; II, 3; III, 3-4; IV, 2-4; V, 2-3.

== Source and influences ==
The play depends upon the Arcadia of Sir Philip Sidney for the source of its plot; the Duke in Cupid's Revenge is a blend of Sidney's King of Lycia and King of Iberia. In turn, Cupid's Revenge served as a source for other dramatists. There is a significant relationship between this play and The Birth of Merlin, one of the plays of the Shakespeare Apocrypha. Plot elements shared by both works – the missing prince, and a ruler and his heir who fall in love with the same woman—could be due to derivation from common sources; but the plays also feature specific shared lines and passages. Critics also cite detectable influences from Cupid's Revenge on the anonymous tragedy Andromana (printed 1660).

== After 1642 ==
Material from Cupid's Revenge, IV, iii was separately performed as a "droll" during the Interregnum when the theatres were forbidden to stage full-length plays. The droll, The Loyal Citizens, was printed in 1662 and 1672. The play was revived in an adaptation during the Restoration era, as many other Fletcherian works were; Samuel Pepys saw it in a version called Love Despised on 17 August 1668.

Performances in the modern era have been rare: Cupid's Revenge was performed by Bad Quarto Productions in New York City in April 2017.

== Plot ==
The play portrays Leontius, the Duke of Lycia, suppressing the customary worship of the god Cupid, the patron deity of the land, in response to the pleadings of his son and daughter, Leucippus and Hisdaspes. In revenge, Cupid (who functions as a chorus in the play, comparable to the choric figures in the tragedies of Seneca or the personification of Revenge in Kyd's The Spanish Tragedy) oversees the ruin and death of the royal family and their retainers through some very unwise amorous entanglements. As he is dying in the play's bloody final scene, Leucippus withdraws his father's edict against worshipping Cupid.
