= Vincenzo Carafa =

Italian Jesuit priest (1585–1649)

Very Reverend Vincenzo Carafa
- Superior-General of the Society of Jesus
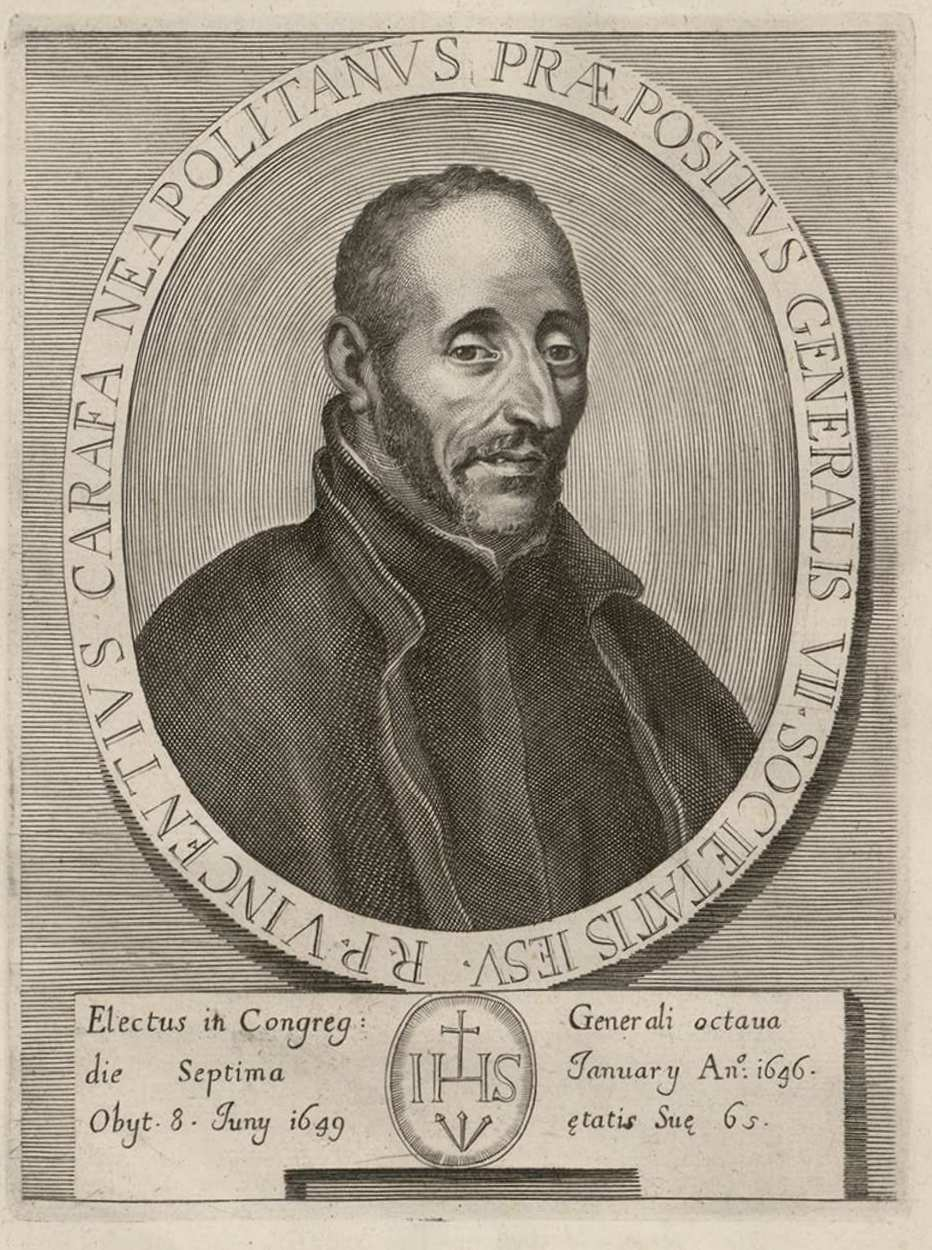
- Church: Catholic Church
- In office: 1645–1649

Personal details
- Born: May 5, 1585 Andria, Kingdom of Naples
- Died: 6 June 1649 (aged 64) Rome, Papal States

Vincenzo Carafa SJ (5 May 1585 – 6 June 1649) was an Italian Jesuit priest and spiritual writer, elected the seventh Superior-General of the Society of Jesus. He wrote using the name Aloysius Sidereus.

== Biography ==
Carafa was born in Andria in the Kingdom of Naples (modern day Italy), of the family of the Counts of Montorio, and a relative of Pope Paul IV. He entered the Society of Jesus on 4 October 1604, and was 60 years of age at his election as general. He died in Rome four years later, aged 64.

He had taught philosophy and governed the principal house of the Society at Naples, and was provincial at the time of the election to the generalship.

In 1648 Carafa called the forty-year old letterato Daniello Bartoli from his itinerant activities as a preacher around Italy to the Casa Professa (Rome) and a permanent position there as the official historian of the Jesuit order. The folio volumes of his Istoria della Compagnia di Gesù began to appear in 1650. Bartoli soon after Carafa's death in 1649 wrote and published the biography of the Neapolitan general. It includes the 1646 episode of Bartoli's shipwreck in a storm off Capri and his recuperation in Naples.

His short term in office coincided with the beginning of the controversy with Jansenist theologians and the troubles with Palafox, Bishop of Puebla. A great scandal occurred in Spain because of unsuccessful business speculations by a coadjutor brother, and in France on account of the open apostasy to Calvinism of a priest; but the martyrdom of Isaac Jogues, Brébeuf, Neville, and others in Canada and England showed that the Society's ancient fervour had not relaxed.

According to St Louis de Montfort in True Devotion to Mary, Carafa would wear an iron band around his feet as a mark of his servitude to Jesus.

The Bona Mors Confraternity was instituted at the suggestion of Father Carafa.

Preliminary local investigations for Carafa's beatification began on 22 March 1693. He was later declared a Servant of God. Pope Francis made reference to him in a list of Jesuit priests associated with devotion to the Sacred Heart in his 2024 encyclical letter on this subject, Dilexit nos.

== Works ==
In 1635 he had published his Fascetto di Mirra (Bundle of Myrrh), which has been translated into several languages. He is the author of several other ascetical works, such as Cammino del Cielo, Cittadino del Cielo, Il Peregrino della terra, Idea Christiani hominis, and Il Serafino, all published before his election as Superior-General. He wrote using the name "Aloysius Sidereus".

Besides personal correspondence his only known writing as Superior General was his letter addressed to all Jesuits: De mediis conservandi primævum spiritum Societatis (The means of preserving the primitive spirit of the Society).

Catholic Church titles
Preceded by Mutio Vitelleschi	Superior General of the Society of Jesus; 1645–1649	Succeeded by Francisco Piccolomini
