= Giulio Cesare Cordara =

Italian Jesuit priest, historian and littérateur

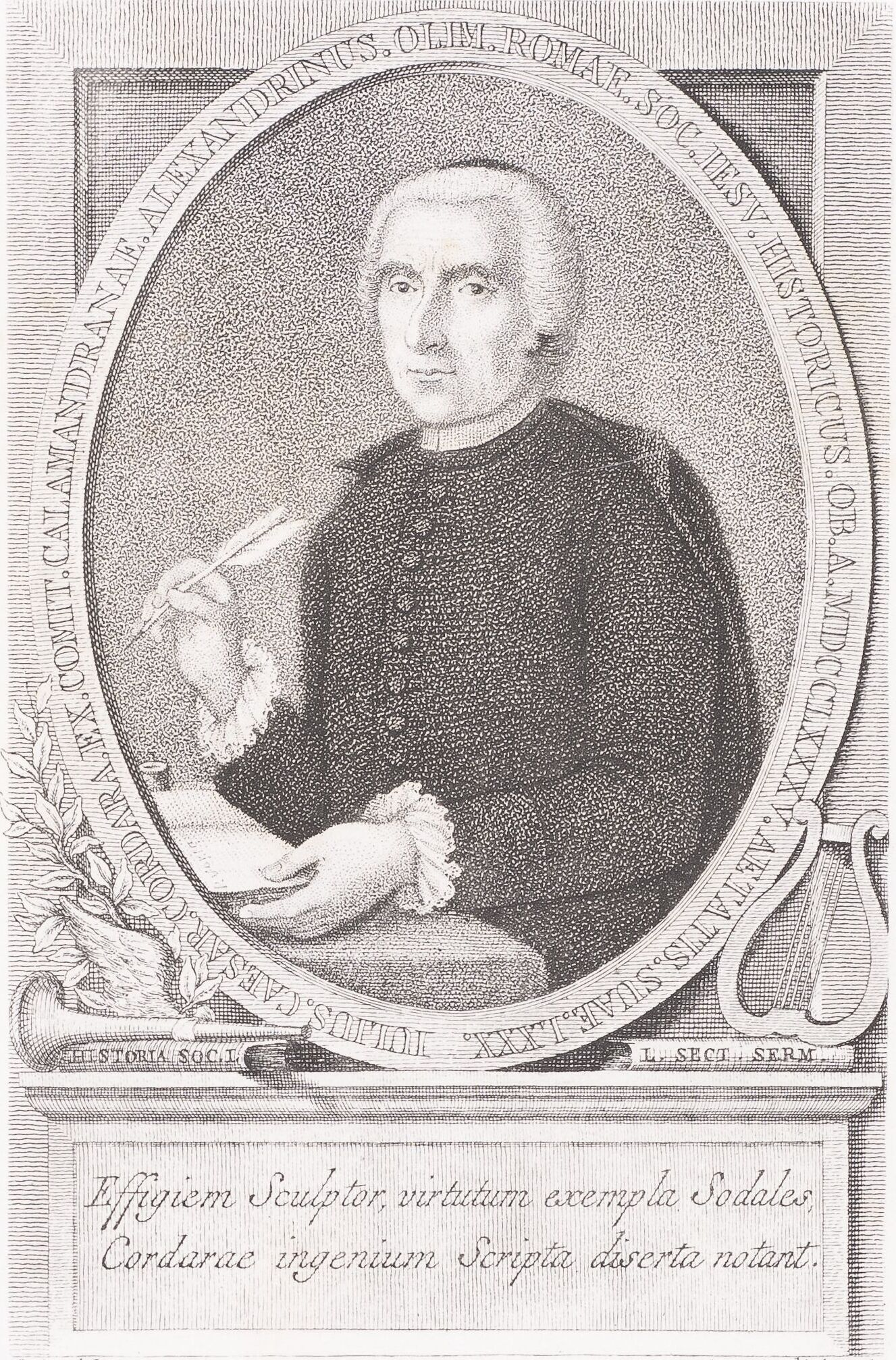
- Jesuit father Giulio Cordara
- Born: 16 December 1704; Calamandrana
- Died: 6 March 1785; Alessandria
- Occupation: Historian
- Notable work: De tota Graeculorum huius aetatis litteratura (1737); De suis ac suorum rebus aliisque suorum temporum usque ad occasum Societatis Jesu commentarii (publ. posth. 1933)

Giulio Cesare Cordara, born on 16 December 1704 and dead on 6 March 1785, was an Italian Jesuit priest, historian and littérateur.

== Biography and works ==
He was born at Calamandrana in Piedmont, the scion of an illustrious and ancient family that came originally from Nice. Young Cordara studied at Rome under the Jesuits, and became a Jesuit himself at the age of fourteen. Subsequently he taught in various colleges of the Order, soon acquiring a great reputation not only for knowledge of general literature, but especially for proficiency in poetry, rhetoric and history. A brilliant discourse on Pope Gregory XIII, whose financial generosity led to the renaming of the Roman College into 'Gregorian university', and a satire on the Cabalists of the day won for him admission into the Academy of the Arcadians.

Several poetical works of his appeared under the pen name of Pameno Cassio. He was in high favor with the exiled Stuarts, then residing in Rome, on account of an allegorical drama, La Morte di Nice, which he composed in honor of the titular King James III, and a history in Latin of the expedition into Scotland of Charles Edward Stuart, Prince of Wales, which some of his admirers look upon as his most finished production. His satires on The Literary Spirit of the Times, published in 1737, are of a high order of merit. In them he pillories a class of contemporary writers who arrogated to themselves the literary censorship of their day, condemned the classification of the sciences and the methods of instruction then in vogue, and even the accepted principles of taste. A seventh and revised edition was brought out at Augsburg in 1764.

His best known work is The History of the Society of Jesus first published in Rome in 1750, with a posthumous, second volume in 1859. This work, written in Latin, was a continuation of the history of the Society of Jesus by Niccolò Orlandini, Francesco Sacchini and Joseph de Jouvancy, and embraced the period of Mutius Vitelleschi (1616–1633). He is also the author of a history of the German College in Rome (1770).

When the Society of Jesus was suppressed, Cordara, who had been a member for more than half a century, withdrew from Rome to Turin and later to Alessandria, where the King of Sardinia had allowed some members of the Society to live unmolested. Notwithstanding his advanced age and his new mode of life, Cordara continued his literary labours and published much in prose and verse. Sommervogel enumerates more than sixty works, large and small, of which he is the author.

He died at Alessandria in 1785. The citizens of his native town erected a marble statue to his memory, in the church of the Barnabites where he was interred.

== Bibliography ==
- Luigi Maria Buchetti, De vita et scriptis Julii Caesaris Cordarae e Societate Iesu, quamdiu ea stetit commentarius, Opere latine e italiane dell'abate Giulio Cesare Cordara, I, Venetiis 1804, pp. 5–16.
- Emilio de Tipaldo, Biografia degli Italiani illustri, III, Venezia 1836, pp. 125–128.
- Carlos Sommervogel, Bibliothèque de la Compagnie de Jésus, II, coll. 1411-1432.
- Giuseppe Castellani, La società romana e italiana del Settecento negli scritti di Giulio Cesare Cordara, Roma 1967.
- Paola Benzo, Bibliografie essenziali ragionate: Giulio Cesare Cordara, in Rivista di Sintesi Letteraria, II (1935), pp. 296–310.
- Lanfranco Caretti, Giulio Cesare Cordara, in Giuseppe Parini, poesie e Prose con appendice di poeti satirici e didascalici del Settecento. Milano-Napoli 1951, pp. 709 ff.
- Adolfo Borgognoni, La vita e l'arte nel Giorno, in Giuseppe Parini, Il Giorno, Verona 1891, pp. 79–83.
- Pietro Bilancini, Prefazione, in I Sermoni di Lucio Settano figlio di Quinto, Trani 1894, pp. 5–57.
- Giosuè Carducci, Il Parini maggiore, in Edizione nazionale delle opere, XVII, pp. 142–147.
- Enrico Rosa, Giulio Cesare Cordara nella sua vita e nelle sue lettere, in La Civiltà Cattolica, LXIV, 1913, pp. 453–471.
- Alessandro Augusto Monti, La Compagnia di Gesù nel territorio della provincia torinese, II, Chieri 1915, p. 685.
