= Andromana =

Andromana, or The Merchant's Wife is a mid-seventeenth-century stage play, a tragedy first published in 1660. It has attracted scholarly attention for the questions of its authorship and the influence of its sources.

The play's date of authorship is unknown with certainty, and has been estimated in the 1642–60 era, during the English Civil War and the Interregnum when the theatres were officially closed. The play was reportedly performed in 1671, once the theatres had re-opened during the Restoration era. The play's May 19, 1660, entry into the Stationers' Register assigns the authorship of the work to James Shirley; the quarto published in the same year by the bookseller John Bellinger (which gives the play the subtitle The Fatal and Deserved End of Disloyalty and Ambition) attributes the play to "J. S." Many critics, however, have judged the play's "Burtonian melancholy" atypical of Shirley's style of drama; and its perceived lack of quality has led many Shirley scholars to omit the play from Shirley's canon.

Andromana is one of the many literary works of its period that draws upon Sir Philip Sidney's Arcadia for its source material, both directly and through the secondary sources of the Beaumont and Fletcher play Cupid's Revenge. (The name "Andromana" derives from ancient Greek; the formidable women of ancient Sparta were known as "Andromanae.") Andromana also shows the influence of Robert Burton's The Anatomy of Melancholy, as mediated through the plays of John Ford.

== Synopsis ==
Plangus, Prince of Iberia, from Book 2 of the Arcadia, is the royal protagonist of the play, though the primary focus, as the title indicates, is on the heroine/villainess Andromana, the Prince's adulterous commoner lover. (Once her husband dies early in the play, drowning "at the Rialto," she is no longer an adulteress, but she remains a villainess; the play's misogyny has caught the notice of critics.) King Ephorbus hopes to cure his son's melancholia, and end his affair with Andromana, by sending the Prince off to war; but this only gives Andromana a chance to seduce the King as well. When Plangus returns to court, he finds that his former lover is now his queen and stepmother. But Andomana assures the Prince that she will remain his mistress.

Plangus, however, rejects this arrangement, causing Andromana to become his enemy. She poisons the relationship between father and son, which leads to the Prince's incarceration—but a popular revolt frees the Prince from prison. Andromana plots a violent revenge once the Prince is rescued; Plangus overhears her instructing her minion, and stabs the man to death before he can act. Andromana cries for help, and the King, who responds, accuses his son of planning violence against the queen/stepmother/lover/slut; the King stabs and kills Plangus. Andromana then stabs the King, and Plangus's friend Inophilus, and then herself. She dies boasting of her villainy.

Critic Fredson Bowers judged the play an overall failure, and viewed the problem as a confusion of genres: Andromana suffers from "a fatal compromise between the villain play and the revenge tragedy."

== Sources ==
- Andrews, Michael C. "The Sources of Andromana." Review of English Studies 19 (1968); pp. 295–300.
- Logan, Terence P., and Denzell S. Smith, eds. The Later Jacobean and Caroline Dramatists: A Survey and Bibliography of Recent Studies in English Renaissance Drama. Lincoln, NE, University of Nebraska Press, 1978.
- Randall, Dale B. J. Winter Fruit: English Drama 1642–1660. Lexington, KY, University Press of Kentucky, 1996.
