= Thomas Plowden =

English Jesuit priest

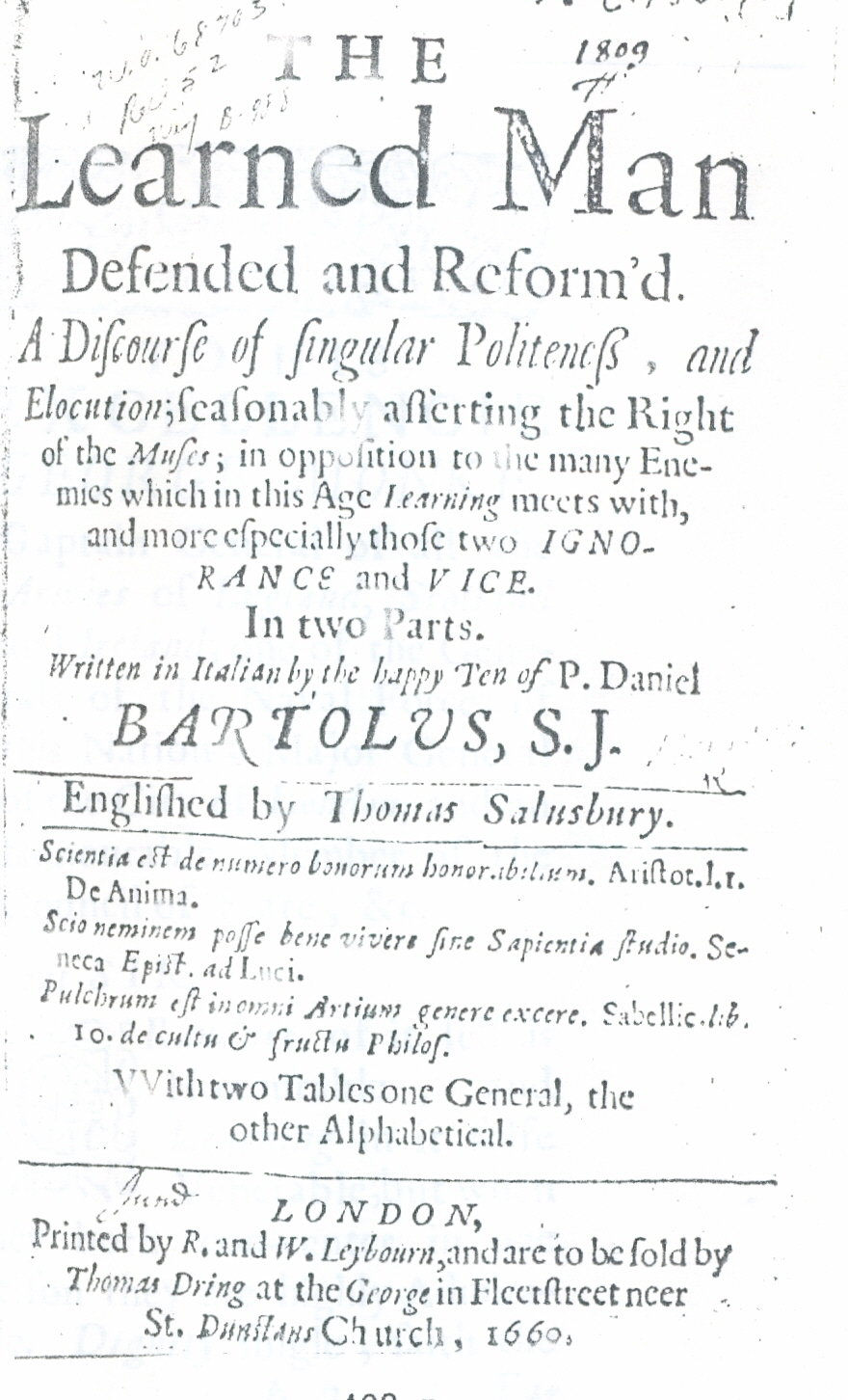
1660 title page.

Thomas Plowden (1594 – 13 February 1664) was an English Jesuit to whom has been traditionally attributed an important translation under the name Thomas Salusbury.

== Life ==
Thomas Plowden was born in Oxfordshire, the third son of Francis Plowden of Shiplake Court (Oxfordshire) and Wokefield Park (Berkshire), younger brother of Edmund Plowden, and grandson of Edmund Plowden.

Plowden was sent on the English Mission about 1622. He was seized, with other priests, by pursuivants in 1628 at Clerkenwell, the London residence of the Jesuits, where he filled various offices of the order, despite the perils of the Mission in London until his death there.

== Translation ==
As was the case with his contemporary Nathaniel Bacon, English Jesuits, given their illegal status as recusants, often published under assumed names. Plowden presented his translations under the name of the distinguished Welsh Salusbury family.

Plowden translated Daniello Bartoli's 1645 L'huomo di lettere into English as The Learned Man Defended and Reformed, dedicating it to George Monk and William Prynne. It was published in 1660 by William Leybourn, and sold by Thomas Dring "near St. Dunstan's Church" on Fleet Street.

The next year, the same printer published Mathematical Collections, with translations of Galileo's Dialogue Concerning the Two Chief World Systems, as well as works of Kepler, Castelli, Tartaglia, and other significant European Restoration authors. This work, dedicated to John Denham, also appeared under the name of Salusbury, but most now attribute it to the real "Thomas Salusbury, Esq."

== Texts ==
- Bartoli, Daniello (1660), The Learned Man Reformed, translator: Thomas Salusbury, Printed by R. and W. Leybourn
- Mathematical Collections and Translations: The First Tome, Printed by R. and W. Leybourn, 1661

== Sources ==
- The entry cites:
  - Henry Foley, Records of the English Province of the Society of Jesus, I, VII
