= Francesco Piccolomini (Jesuit) =

Italian Jesuit

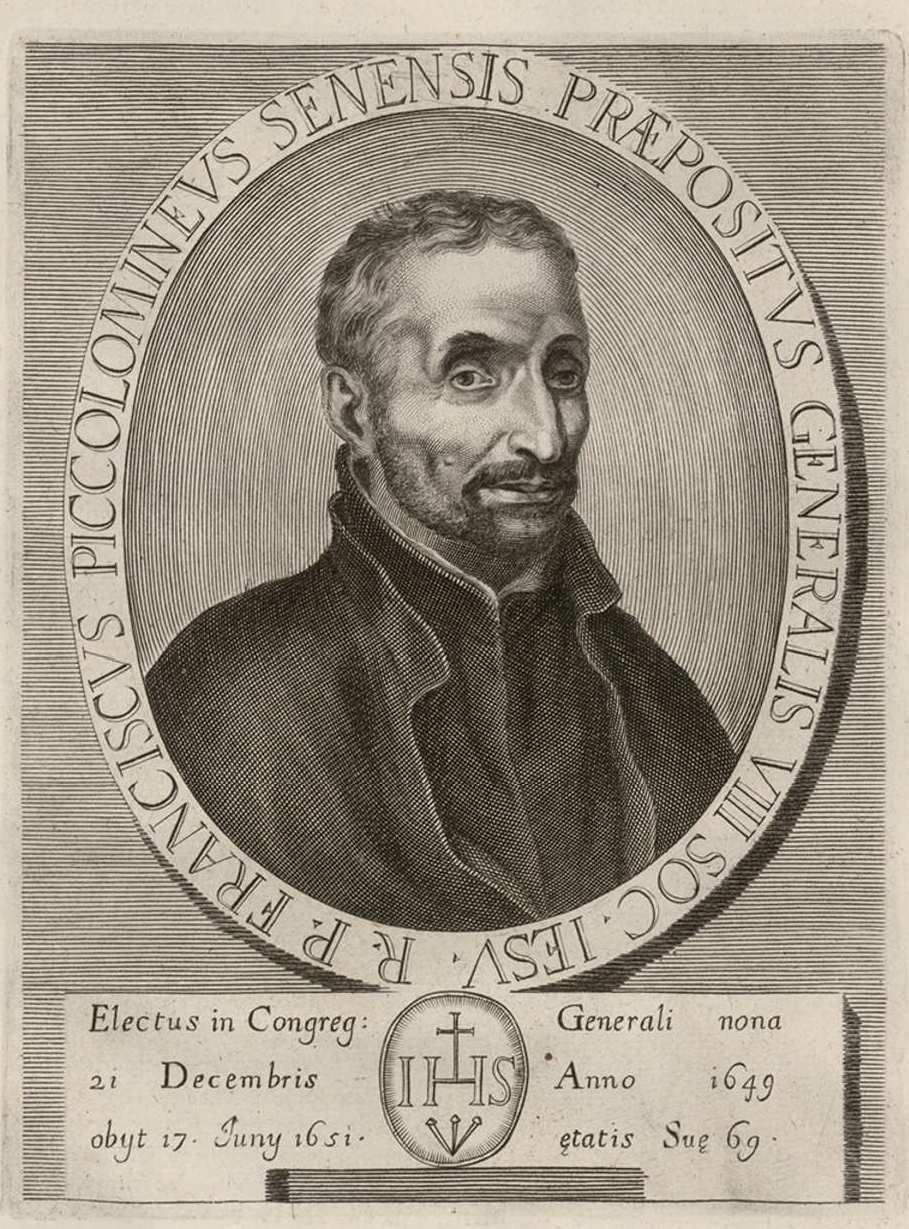
Francesco Piccolomini

Francesco Piccolomini (22 October 1582 – 17 June 1651) was an Italian Jesuit, elected the eighth Superior-General of the Society of Jesus.

== Biography ==
After Vincenzo Carafa, the 7th Superior General of the Order, died on 8 February 1649, a General Congregation made of representatives of the various Jesuit provinces, met on 21 December of the same year and chose Piccolomini as his successor. He died after eighteen months in office.

Before his election as General he had been professor of philosophy at the Roman College; he died at age 68.

Catholic Church titles
Preceded by Vincenzo Carafa	Superior General of the Society of Jesus; 1649 – 1651	Succeeded by Aloysius Gottifredi
