= L'huomo di lettere =

1645 treatise by Daniello Bartoli

L'huomo di lettere difeso ed emendato
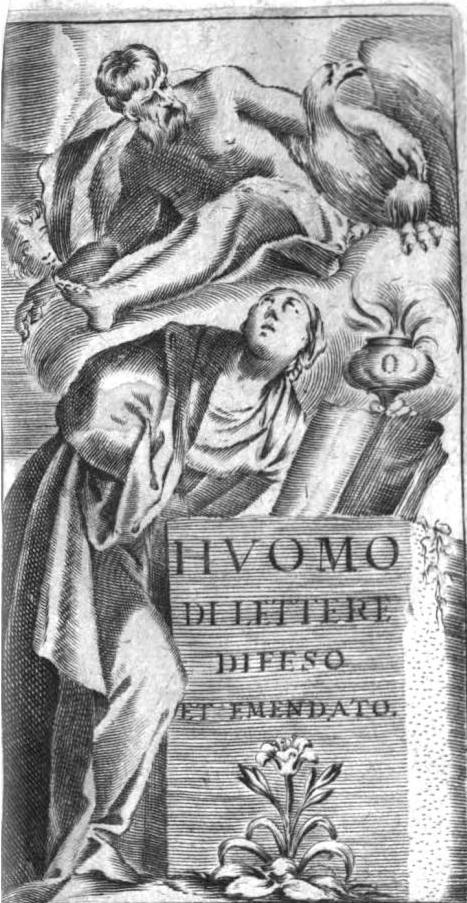
- L'huomo di lettere difeso ed emendato, Venice: Giunti e Baba, 1651
- Author: Daniello Bartoli
- Language: Italian
- Subject: Man of letters
- Publisher: Eredi di Francesco Corbelletti, Rome
- Publication date: 1645
- Publication place: Italy
- Media type: Print

L'huomo di lettere difeso ed emendato (Rome, 1645) by the Ferrarese Jesuit Daniello Bartoli (1608–1685) is a two-part treatise on the man of letters bringing together material he had assembled over twenty years since his entry in 1623 into the Society of Jesus as a brilliant student, a successful teacher of rhetoric and a celebrated preacher. His international literary success with this work led to his appointment in Rome as the official historiographer of the Society of Jesus and his monumental Istoria della Compagnia di Gesu (1650–1673).

The entire patrimony of classical rhetoric was centered around the figure of the Ciceronian Orator, the vir bonus dicendi peritus of Quintilian as the ideal combination of moral values and eloquence. In Jesuit terms this dual ideal becomes santità e lettere for membership in the emerging Republic of Letters. Bartoli confidently asserts the validity of this model represented in his huomo di lettere. In his introduction Bartoli constructs his two part presentation out of a maxim of oratory, that recalls Quintilian, but is of his fashioning: "Si qua obscuritas litterarum, nisi quia sed obtrectationibus imperitorum vel abutentium vitio" And he effectively dramatizes a tableau of the archetypical Anaxagoras enlightening the ignorant by demystifying the cause of a solar eclipse through his scientific understanding. This is a prelude to the cohort of ancient philosophers he employs as part of his rhetorical agenda to characterize the Senecan literatus as the model for his philosopher hero, the man of letters. Part I defends the man of letters against the neglect of rulers and fortune and make him a conduit of an intellectual beatitude, il gusto dell'intendere, that is the basis of his moral and social Ataraxia. He develops his theme of Stoic superiority under two headings, La Sapienza felice anche nelle Miserie and L'Ignoranza misera anche nelle Felicità with regular reference to the Epistulae morales ad Lucilium of Seneca, and exempla taken from Diogenes Laërtius, Plutarch, Pliny, Aelian, with frequent quotations, often unsourced, from Virgil and the poets, and headed by Augustine and Tertullian and Synesius among the Christian writers. Part II seeks to emend the faults of the present day writer in 9 chapters under the headings, Ladroneccio, Lascivia, Maldicenza, Alterezza, Dapoccaggine, Imprudenza, Ambitione, Avarizia, Oscurita. He calls on more modern authors in these chapters, such as Oviedo, Erasmus and Cardanus. The final chapter takes particular aim at excesses of the precious baroque style then in vogue and encourages the beginner to profit from the ars rhetorica expounded by Cicero in style and composition. His paraenesis combines a stream of classical exempla with modern instances of the great Italian explorers, such as his heroes in geography, Christopher Columbus, and astronomy, Galileo Galilei, and lively references to the modern tradition of Italian letters from Dante Alighieri, his favorite, to Ludovico Ariosto and Torquato Tasso.

== Dell'Huomo di lettere difeso ed emendato 1645 ==
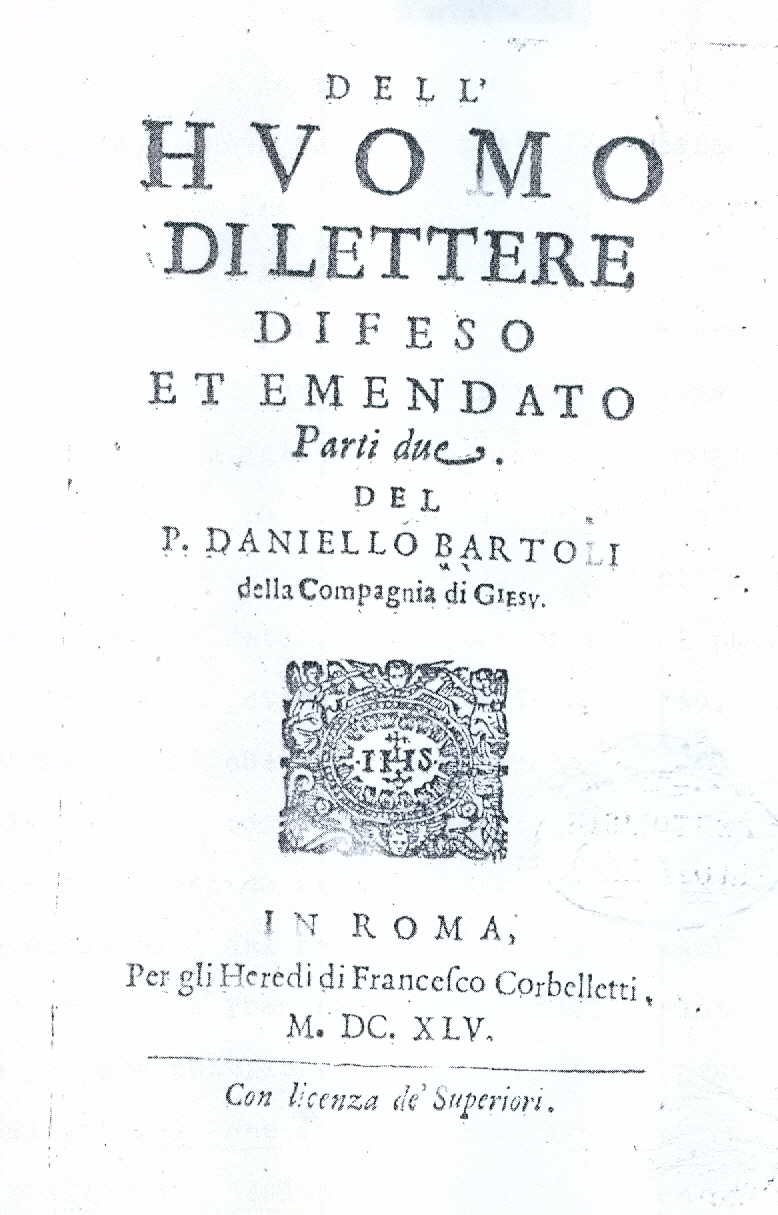
Rome: Francesco Corbelletti, 1645

In 1645 the appearance of Bartoli's first book initiated an international literary sensation. The work, reprinted eight times in the first year, quickly inserted itself in the regional literary debates of the time, with an unauthorized Florentine edition (1645) dedicated to Salvator Rosa soon challenged by a Bolognese edition (1646) dedicated to Virgilio Malvezzi. Over the following three decades and beyond there were another thirty printings at a dozen different Italian presses, especially Venetian, of which half a dozen "per Giunti" with a signature frontispiece title illustration.

Bartoli's literary "how to" book spread its influence well beyond the geographical and literary confines of Italy. During the process of her conversion to Roman Catholicism at the hands of the Jesuits in the 1650s Christina, Queen of Sweden specifically requested a copy of this celebrated work be sent to her in Stockholm. It seems to have fulfilled the Baroque dream of an energetic rhetorical eloquence to which the age aspired. Through its gallery of exemplary stylizations and picturesque moral encouragements it defends and emends not only the aspiring letterato, but also an updated classicism open to modernity, but diffident of excess. The book's international proliferation made it a vehicle of the cultural ascendancy of the Jesuits as modern classicists during the Baroque. Years later, Bartoli provided a revision for the collected edition. After Bartoli's death in 1685 editions of his works continued to appear, particularly in the early nineteenth century when he was idolized for his mastery of language and style. Giacinto Marietti printed an excellent complete edition of Bartoli in Turin between 1825 and 1856.

== Translations ==
In Bartoli's lifetime and beyond, in addition to the host of Italian editions, his celebrated work was translated into six different languages by men of letters of other nationalities, Jesuits and non-Jesuits, illustrating on a European scale the Baroque vogue that Bartoli enjoyed in the Republic of Letters of his time. Ie appeared in 1651 in French, in 1654 in German, in 1660 in English, in 1672 in Latin, in 1678 in Spanish and in 1722 in Dutch.

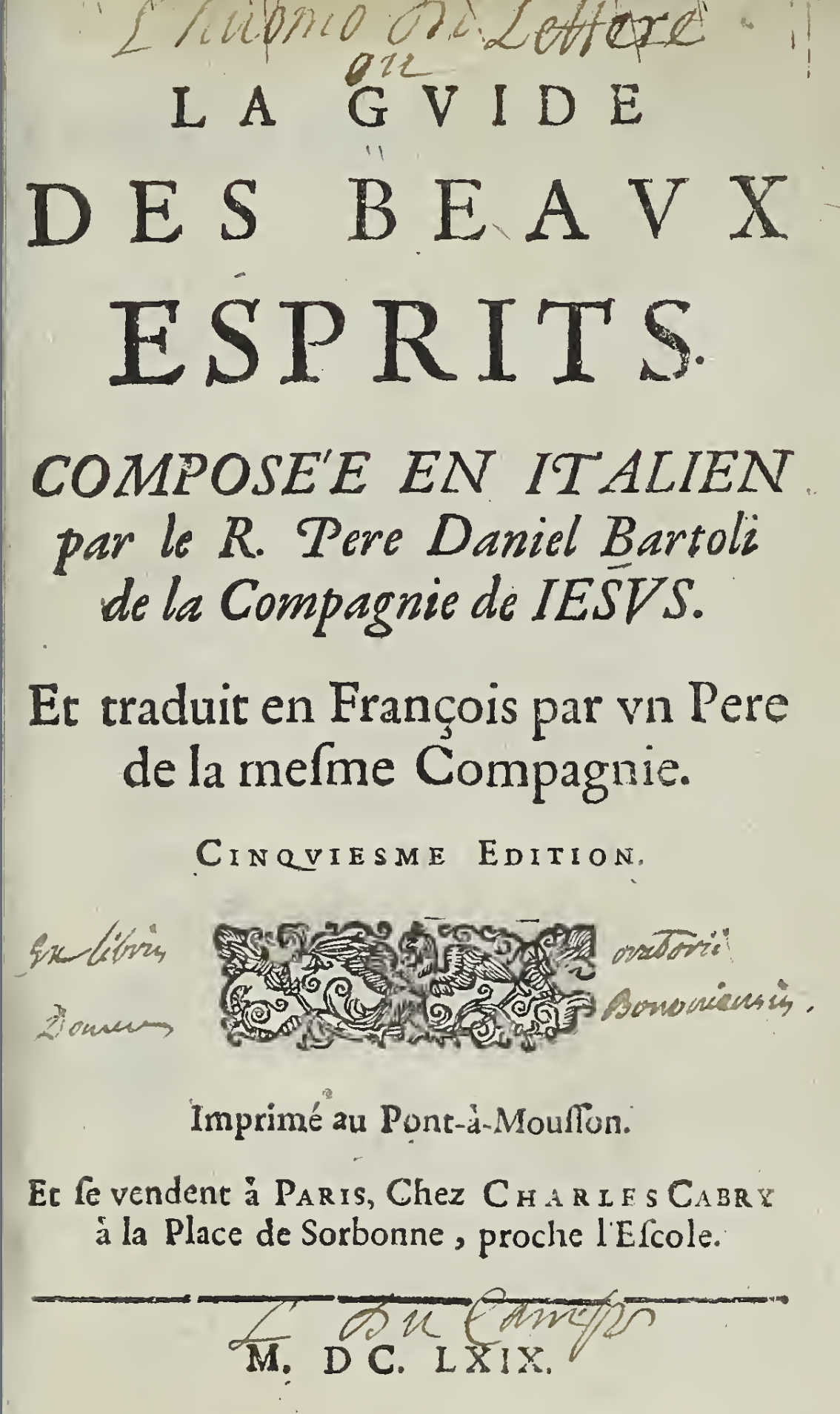
Pont à Mousson: Jesuit press, 1669

== La Guide des Beaux Esprits 1651 ==
The French translation was first to appear in 1651. It was done by the Jesuit writer Thomas LeBlanc, (1599–1669) upon his return from Italy where the book had made Bartoli famous for his eloquence and erudition. LeBlanc was author of a five-volume commentary on the Psalms of David in Latin and of several pastoral works in French. It first appeared as L'Homme de lettres (Pont-a-Mousson). In 1654 it was reprinted under the more galant title, La Guide des Beaux Esprits and as such went through several editions. The fifth printing of 1669 was dedicated to Charles Le Jay, Baron de Tilly, from the ascendant noblesse de robe, influential supporters of the Society of Jesus and its colleges. Timothée Hureau de Livoy (1715–1777), a Barnabite priest and lexicographer was the translator of Denina and Muratori. In 1769 his Bartoli translation appeared with critical notes L'Homme de lettres, ouvrage traduit de l'italien augmenté de Notes historiques et critiques

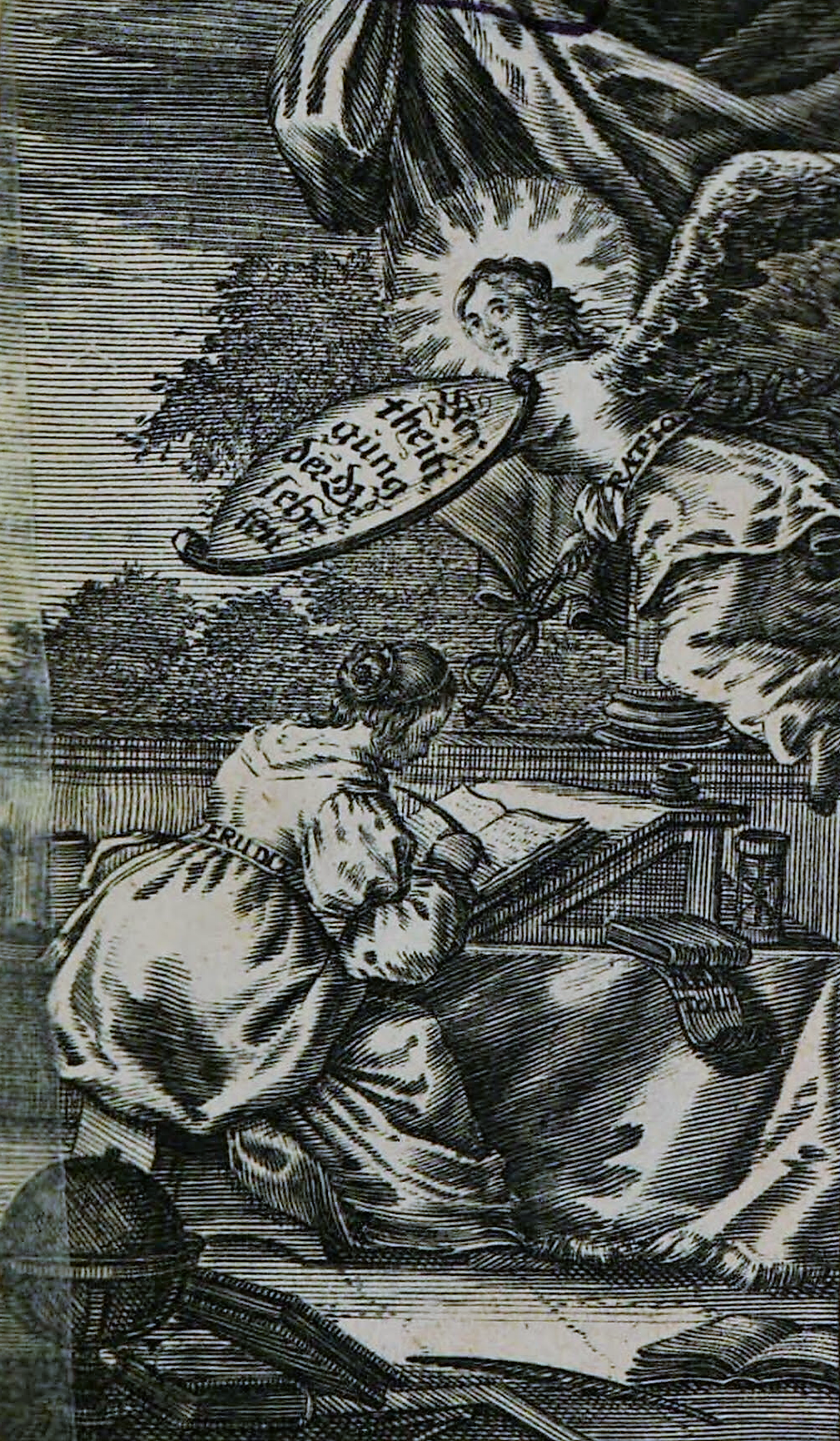
Nürnberg: Michael Endter, 1654

== Vertheidigung der Kunstliebenden und Gelehrten Anständige Sitten 1654 ==
In Nürnberg in 1654 a German version appeared anonymously under the title, Vertheidigung der Kunstliebenden und Gelehrten anstandigere Sitten, The translator, Count Georg Adam von Kuefstein (1605–1656) in his preface signs himself Der Kunstliebende, his moniker as a member of the prestigious language academy, the Fruitbearing Society (Fruchtbringende Gesellschaft) under whose name and auspices the book was issued. There is a frontispiece title engraving with a shielded angel "ratio" defending "Vertheidigung" the writer "eruditio". Underneath the book on the writing table there is a scroll which surreptitiously spells out the author's name as "D. BAR/TOLI". After the title page come the translator's preface and 11 poetical compositions by other Gesellschaft members including the Nurenberger Georg Philipp Harsdörffer, Der Spielende, Sigmund von Birken who oversaw the preparation of the book, Wolf Heimhardt von Hohberg Der Sinnreiche, Cambyse Bianchi del Piano, Der Seltene, from Bologna, who collaborated with Kufstein on the translation, Johan Wilhelm von Stuhlenberg, Der Ungluckselige, Erasmus der Junger von Strahlemberg, Der Liedende, Christoff Dietrick von Schallenberg, Der Schallende and Harsdörffer's son, Carl Gottfried. These poetic exercises, including a pastoral dialogue, introduce the themes of Bartoli's text. Bartoli's numerous Latin quotations are given here in German, directly along with the citations in the margin. At the end there is an index for subjects and one for persons and finally a helpful list of the classical authorities with page numbers.

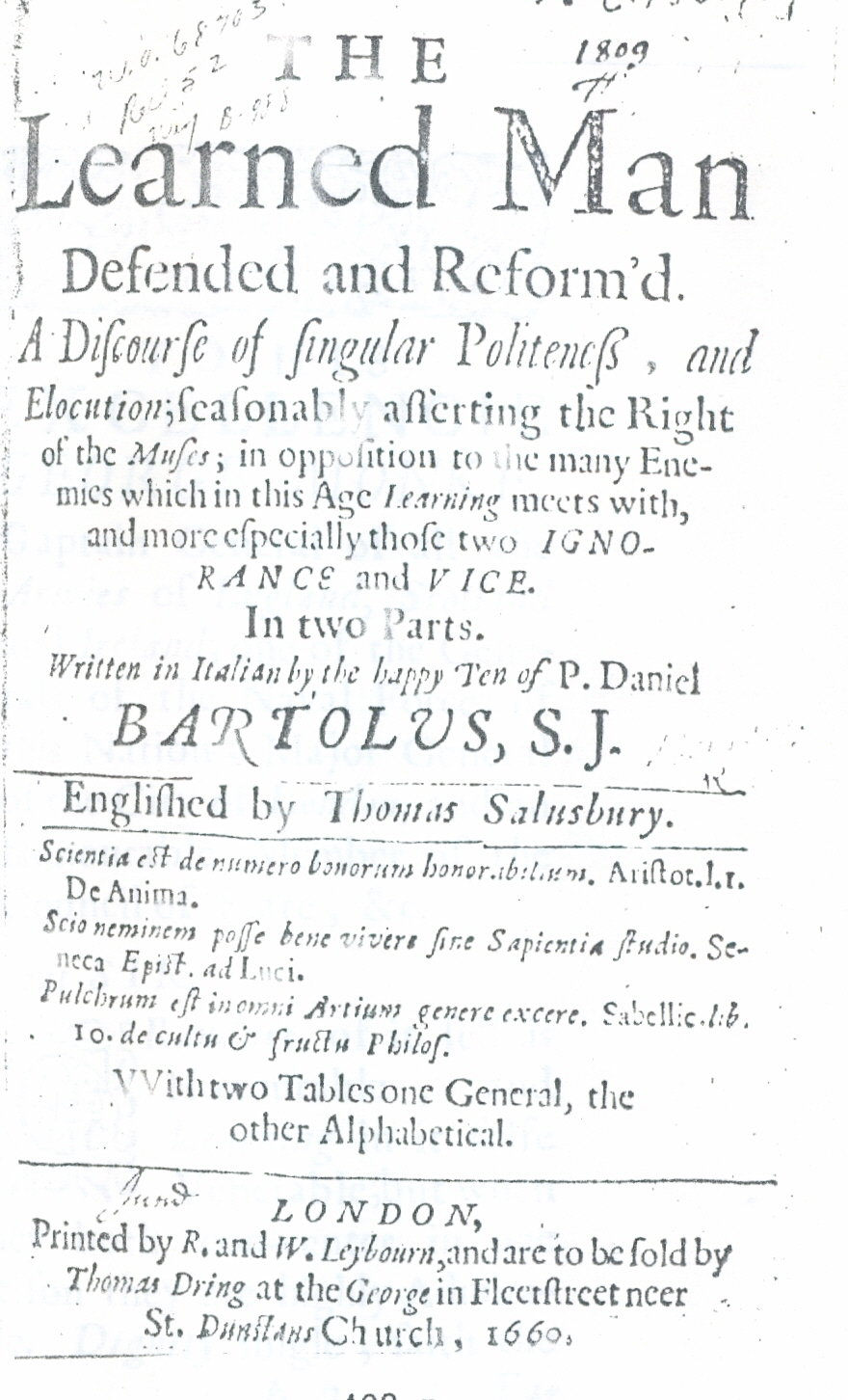
London: William Leybourn, 1660

== The Learned Man Defended and Reformed 1660 ==
During Cromwell's Protectorate in the 1650s many English notables, such as Sir Kenelm Digby gravitated to Rome and were caught up in the vogue of Bartoli's L'huomo di lettere. Digby is said to have made a translation, but this was not printed, though it is mentioned in the foreword of Thomas Salusbury whose translation coincides with the return of Charles II. The London edition of 1660 celebrates the Restoration of the Stuarts with letters of dedication to two of its chief protagonists George Monck and William Prynne. A connoisseur of Italy and admirer of Bartoli, Thomas Salusbury (ca.1623-ca.1666) was connected with the prominent Anglo- Welsh Salusbury family, whose coat of arms is on the frontispiece engraving of The Learned Man. Some have attributed this translation to the English Jesuit Thomas Plowden. Salusbury followed up with Mathematical Collections and Translations (1661) of important scientific works by Galileo and his contemporaries The rare second volume of translated treatises (1665) has the first biography of Galileo Galilei in English. The title page of The Learned Man states the work was written by "the happy pen" of p. Daniel Bartolus, S.J. The book was printed by the mathematician and surveyor William Leybourn and distributed by Thomas Dring, an important London bookseller.

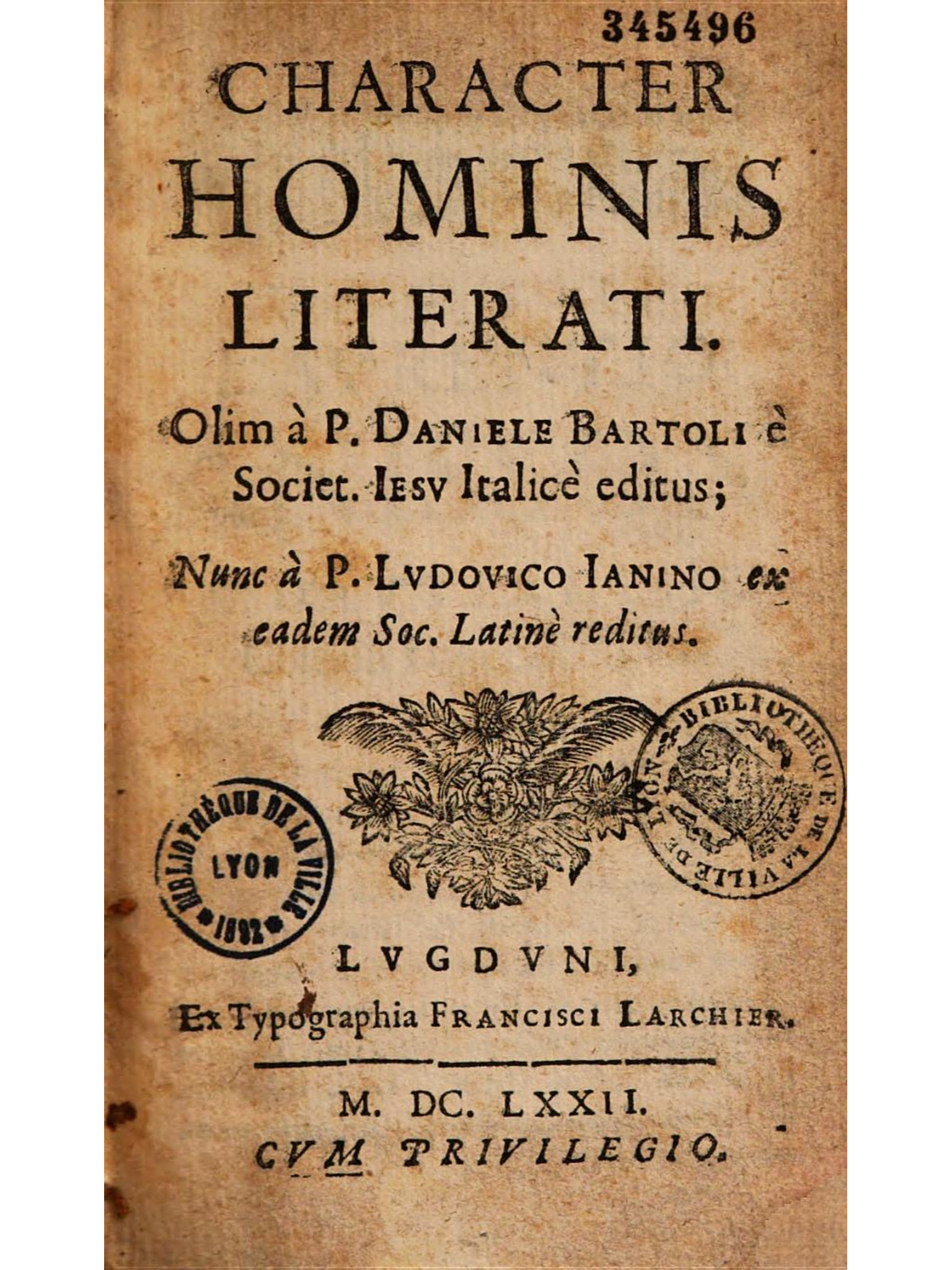
Lyons: Francois Larchier, 1672

== Character Hominis Literati 1672 ==
Louis Janin, S.J. (1590–1672) began as a teacher of classical style in France and spent 15 years in Rome as Latin secretary for the French Assistancy at Jesuit headquarters before he returned to Lyons. There he diligently translated five large volumes of Bartoli's Italian Istoria della Compagnia di Gesu between 1665 and 1671. His Latin version of the L'huomo di lettere appeared in Lyons in 1672. A second printing appeared in Cologne in 1674 "opusculum docentibus atque ac discentibus utile ac necessarium". In 1704 this Latin translation was partially reprinted by the Jesuit Faculty of Theology at University of Wroclaw (Breslau), recently founded by Leopold I, Holy Roman Emperor. It was issued in honor of its first graduates, four new doctors of theology. To Janin's version was added a second translation into Latin by the Lutheran pastor in the service of Frederick I of Prussia in Prussian Kűstrin, Johann Georg Hoffmann, (1648–1719) Homo literatus defensus et emendatus. It was printed in nearby Frankfurt an der Oder in 1693. His translation was published by Jeremias Schrey The text contains an excellent system of embedded biblical references. Hoffman became a doctor of Sacred Scripture in 1696.

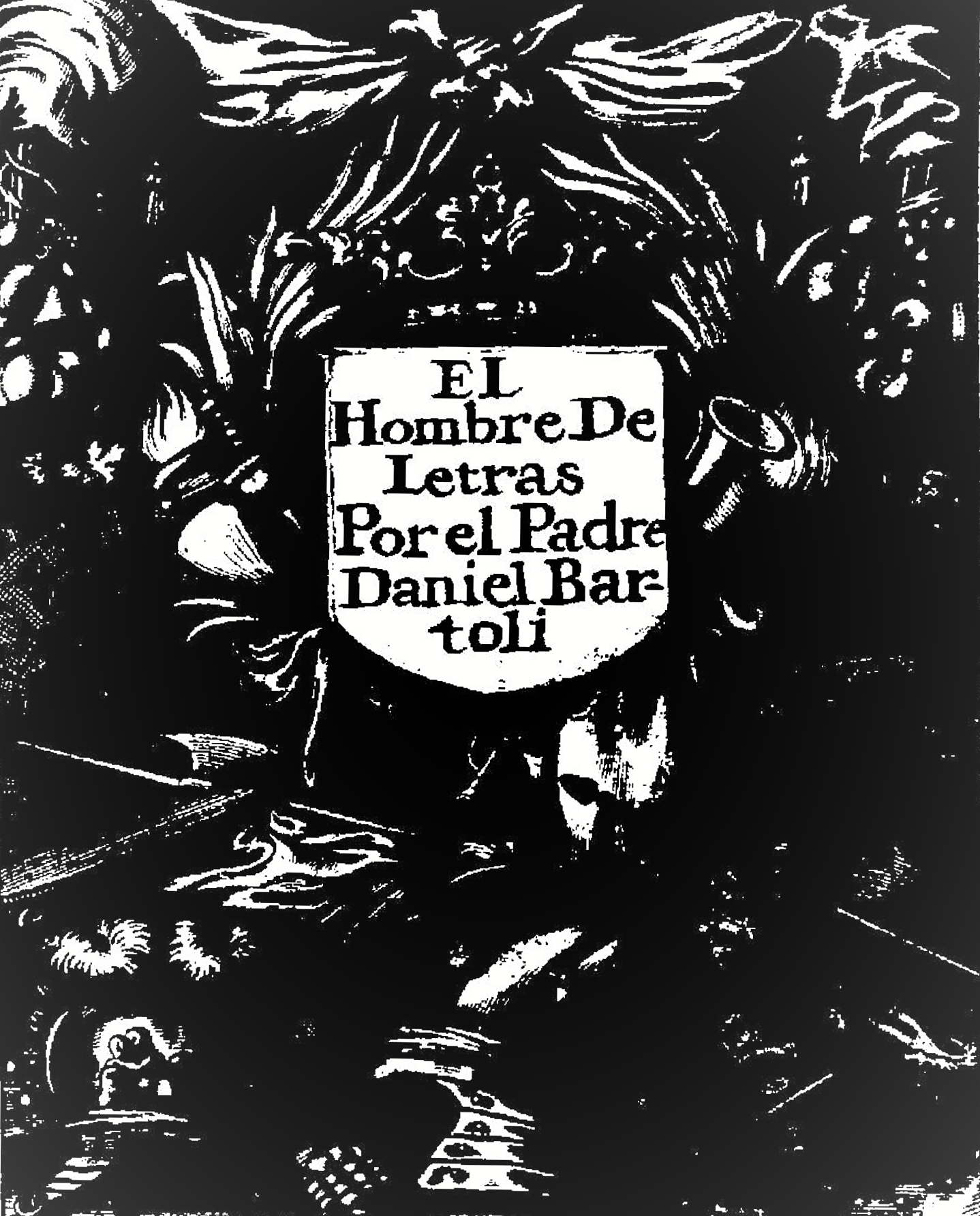
Madrid: Andres Garcia de la Iglesia, 1678

== El Hombre de Letras 1678 ==
El Hombre de Letras (Madrid, 1678) provided an excellent Spanish version by the Aragonese priest-musician Gaspar Sanz (1640–1710). Studying music in Italy Sanz read Bartoli's well known treatise. He is today more famous for his compositions and Instruccion de Musica sobre la Guitarra Espanola. The guitar pieces by Sanz are still a central part of the guitar repertory and are most familiar through Joaquin Rodgrigo's Fantasia para un gentilhombre. Sanz provides Castilian renderings for the extensive Latin quotations in the text and cites the original texts in the margins. This work was reprinted in Barcelona by Juan Jolis in 1744. The title page mentions a Portuguese translation that has not surfaced. It was printed again in a handsome Madrid edition in 1786.

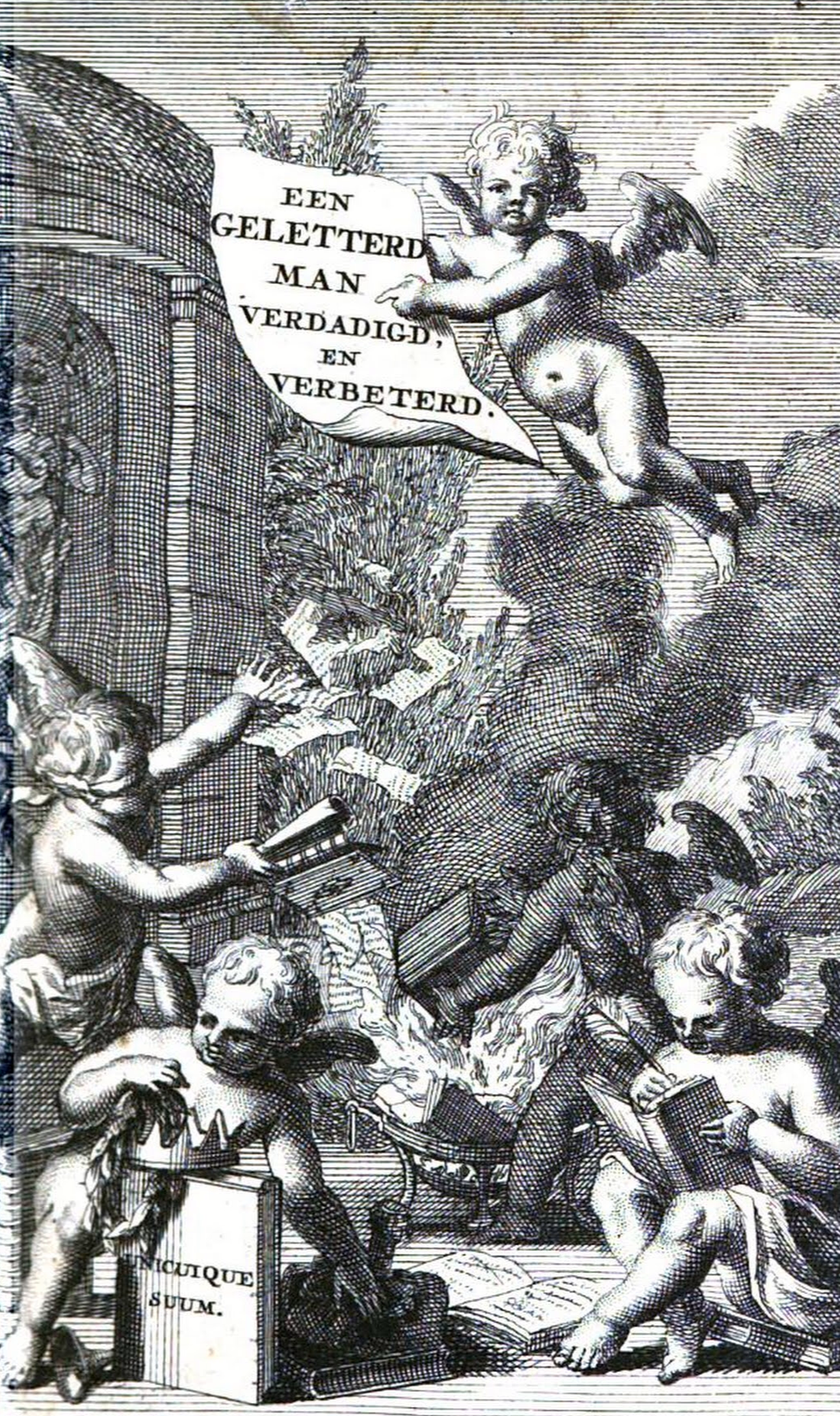

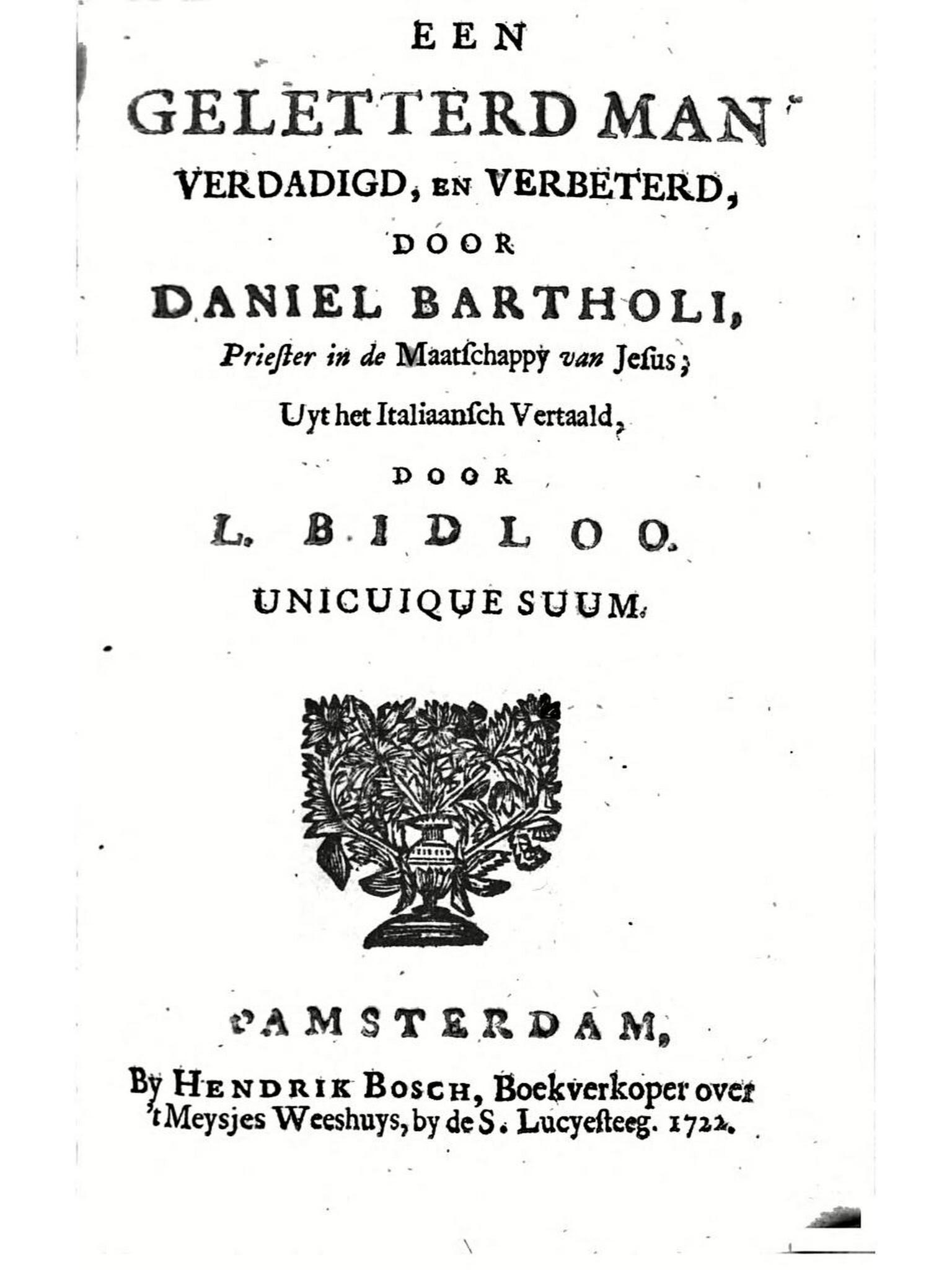
Amsterdam: Hendrik Bosch, 1722

== Een Geletterd Man Verdadigd en Verbeterd 1722 ==
Amsterdam's enterprising and productive man of letters, Lambert Bidloo (1638–1724) was, like the Ferrarese Bartoli's father, Tiburzio, an apothecary by profession. As a man of letters he wrote scientific and poetic works in Latin, as well as in Dutch. Bidloo became an active member of Amsterdam's Mennonite community when it split in two (1664). His Dutch prose works are concerned mostly with defending the more conservative views of his church, called the "Zonists" and led by Samuel Apostool against the more liberal "Lamist" Mennonites led by Galenus Abramsz de Hann. From his youth on he wrote pamphlets against the laxity of his Lamist opponents, tainted with Socinianism. In his old age he set to the challenge of translating Bartoli. His rendering of the Italian work has a beautiful frontispiece engraving (perhaps by the young and talented Jacobus Houbraken). The title page proposes the defense and bettering of Bartoli's "lettered" man. Even after Bidloo's death in 1724 Hendrik Bosch, his Amsterdam printer, likely a fellow Mennonite, would continue publishing the works of the learned chemist. The preface of his translation begins with a dedication to his daughter Maria, his faithful "bibliothecaria". He goes on to recall his first introduction to Bartoli's opuscula as a literary nec plus ultra through his acquaintance with Aloysius Bevilacqua who arrived in the Netherlands to represent pope Innocent XI as nuncio at the Congress of Nijmegen (1677/78), seeking peace for the United Provinces against the invading Louis XIV. As was the custom, the book is decorated with a garland of laudatory poems by noted literary contemporaries, Pieter Langendijk, Jan van Hoogstraten. Matthaeus Brouwerius, et al. Bidloo provides the section headings of the treatise with chapter numbers. Part I, 1–11; Part II, 1-27.

== References and Online Links ==
The Man of Letters, Defended and Emended: An Annotated Modern Translation of l'Huomo Di Lettere Difeso Et Emendato (1645) from Italian and Latin by Gregory Woods. 2018 @Amazon.com

== Wikisource ==
Dell'uomo di lettere difeso ed emendato The modernized text comes from the complete Opere (Marietti, Torino) vol. 28, (1834).
