= Bona Mors Confraternity =

Roman Catholic association, founded 1648

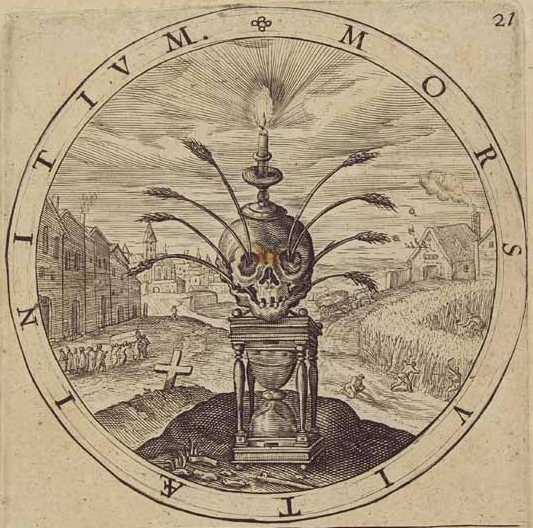

The Roman Catholic Bona Mors Confraternity (Latin for "Good" or "Happy Death") was founded on 2 October 1648, in the Church of the Gesù, Rome, by Vincenzo Carafa, seventh General of the Society of Jesus. In 1729, it was raised to an archconfraternity by Benedict XIII. The object of the association is to prepare its members by a well-regulated life to die in peace with God.

== History ==
The Bona Mors Confraternity began as an association, called the "Congregation of Our Lord Jesus Christ dying on the Cross, and of the Most Blessed Virgin Mary, his sorrowful Mother". It was founded in October, 1648, in the Church of the Gesù in Rome, by Father Vincenzo Caraffa, later seventh General of the Society of Jesus. The following year Vicar General de Montmorency, aggregated it to the Prima-Primaria Sodality of Our Lady at the Roman College, giving it the canonical title of the "Five Most Sacred Wounds of Christ and Our Lady of Sorrows". The original Bona Mors Sodality, therefore, was a Sodality of Our Lady, with the special feature added of preparing its members for a happy death. Its seat was in a room back of the Chapel of the Madonna della Strada (Our Lady of the Wayside) at the Church of the Gesù. Its practices of piety were approved by Pope Alexander VII in August 1655. According to biographer Filippo Baldinucci, Gian Lorenzo Bernini practiced the devotion for many years.

In 1729 it was raised to an archconfraternity by Benedict XIII. He authorized the father general of the Society of Jesus, who in virtue of his office, was the director, to erect confraternities in all churches of the Jesuit order. In 1827 Leo XII gave to the director general the power to erect and affiliate branch confraternities in churches not belonging to the Society of Jesus, and to give them a share in all the privileges and indulgences of the archconfraternity.

The rules and program of the Bona Mors Confraternity soon spread throughout Jesuit institutions. English Jesuits brought the Confraternity of Bona Mors to Britain, where it was remained active up until the Second World War. In the late nineteenth century, it was the practice at the Church of the Immaculate Conception, Farm Street for Mass to be said every Tuesday for the Confraternity. Monthly prayer services were held at Stonyhurst and Wimbledon. The Confraternity was established at Old St. Joseph's Church in Philadelphia, Pennsylvania in 1838 by Felix-Joseph Barbelin. Members of Bona Mors were among those confraternities present in April 1891 for the laying of the cornerstone of St. Joseph's Seminary in Dunwoodie.

New regulations were adopted in 1911 proposed a monthly General Communion, and a monthly Retreat or day of recollection in preparation for death; also suggested was a monthly Mass for deceased members.

James Joyce makes reference to Bona Mors in A Portrait of the Artist as a Young Man, where the confraternity prayers are recited at Clongowes at Benediction on the first Sunday of the month.

== Conditions for membership ==
The conditions for membership are to present oneself to the director; to express to him one's desire to become a member; to receive from him an outward sign of acceptance, usually in the form of a certificate of admission; and to have one's name registered in the local Bona Mors register. Only "by an unusual and extraordinary exception," says a decree of the Sacred Congregation for Indulgences, "is it allowed to enroll those absent." The director is authorized to decide what constitutes such an exceptional case. The practices of the association and the indulgences granted to the members are specified in the manual of the confraternity.

== Rules of the confraternity ==
According to the St. Vincent's manual there are two rules to observe (neither binding under pain of sin):

1. Every one is to say daily, three times, Our Father, and Hail Mary, in memory of the three hours Jesus hung upon the cross, with the intention of obtaining for themselves, and others of the congregation, a happy death. Likewise they shall say, every day, not only for themselves, but also for those at that time in their agonies, or who shall be next under that dreadful trial: Lord! into thy hands I recommend my spirit, and recommend all agonizing souls. - Mary, Mather of Grace, Mother of Mercy, defend us from the enemy, and receive us at the hour of death. Amen.
2. The Associates (if they can, without great inconvenience) are to frequent the holy communion once every month; that they may be enriched with a plenary indulgence, which may be applied to the suffering souls in purgatory, by way of suffrage. In these communions they are to petition for themselves, and others of the confraternity, a happy death: and before they leave the Church, they are to recite, five times, Our Father, and Hail Mary, in honor of the Five Holy Wounds, for those of the congregation, who are in tribulation, who are sick, dying, or have departed.

Among the devout practices specially recommended to the members of the Confraternity, are the performance of works of mercy, to visit the sick, and to accompany the dead to the grave, and to pray for the repose of their souls.

== See also ==
- Archconfraternity
- Death
