= Joseph de Jouvancy =

French poet, pedagogue, philologist, and historian

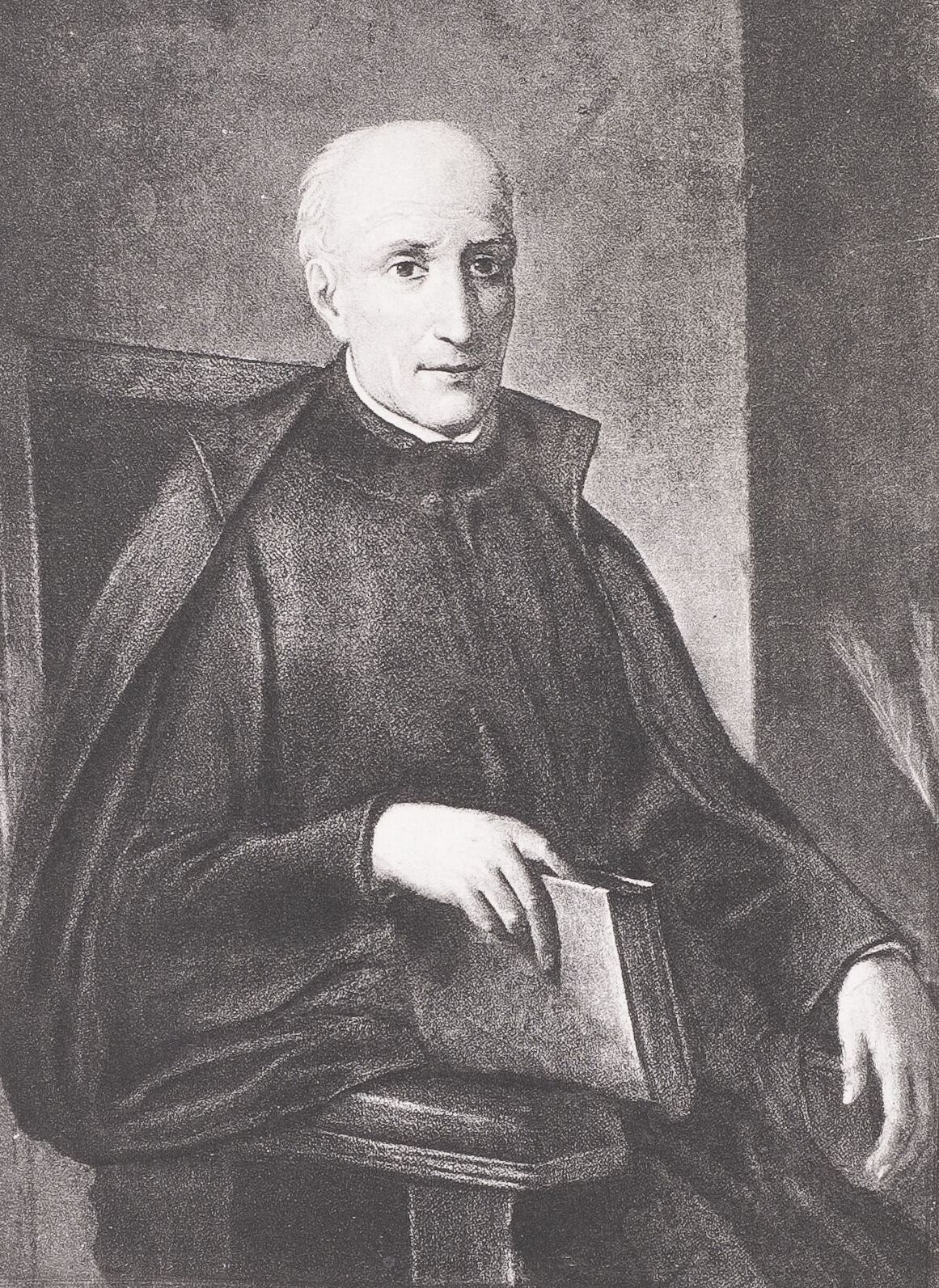
Engraved portrait of Joseph de Jouvancy

Joseph de Jouvancy SJ (also Jouvency; Latinised Josephus Juvencius; 14 September 1643, Paris – 29 May 1719, Rome) was a French poet, pedagogue, philologist, and historian.

== Life ==
Jouvancy was born in Paris on 14 September 1643. At the age of sixteen he entered the Society of Jesus, and after completing his studies he taught grammar at the college at Compiègne, and rhetoric at Caen and the College of La Flèche. He made his profession in the latter place in 1677 and was afterwards appointed professor at the Lycee Louis-le-Grand in Paris. In 1699 he was called by his superiors to Rome to continue the history of the Society of Jesus begun by Niccolò Orlandini, and was engaged on this work until his death.

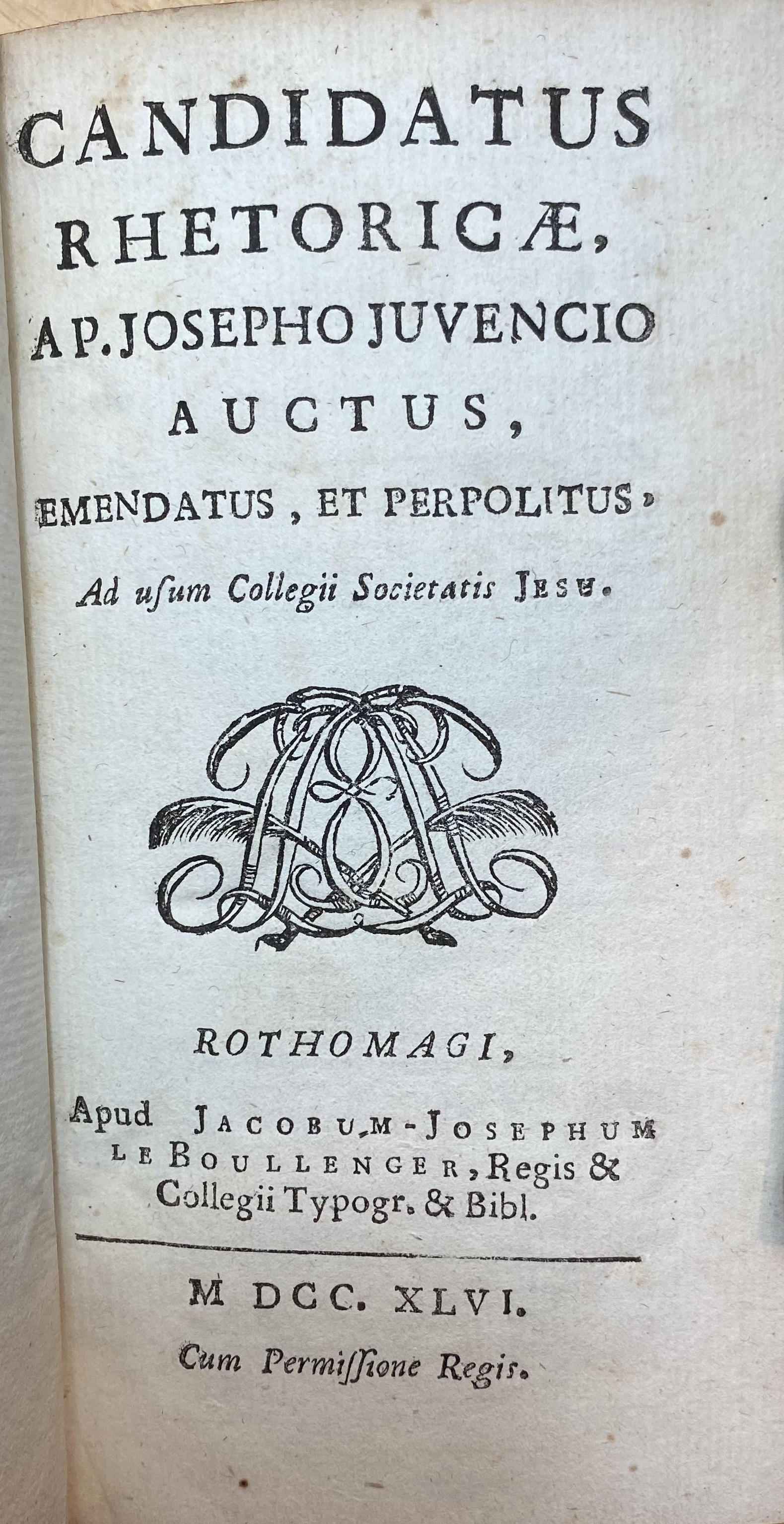
Title page of Jouvancy's "Candidatus Rhetoricæ", 1746 edition printed in Rouen.

== Writings ==
Jouvancy wrote largely upon those topics which engaged his attention as a member of the order. He composed about ten tragedies, all of which were published in Paris, and several of which were frequently acted. It is not certain, however, that all the dramas ascribed to Jouvancy were written by him, for some of them are also attributed to other members of the order. Jouvancy also wrote many poems in Latin and Greek for special occasions. He procured the translation into Latin of many works in other languages, such as the funeral oration for Prince Henri de Bourbon, oldest son of Louis XIV, delivered in December 1683 in Paris, by the celebrated pulpit orator Louis Bourdaloue, Cleander et Eudoxius, a translation of the Entretiens de Cléandre et d'Eudoxe of Father Daniel. This latter work is a response to the accusations brought against the Society of Jesus by its critics; in 1703 it was put on the Index. The translation of the theological letters of Father Daniel to the Dominican Father Alexander Natalis contains a comparison of the teachings of St. Thomas and of the theologians of the Society of Jesus concerning Probabilism and its relation to the concept of Divine grace. In 1704 appeared Jouvancy's Appendix de Diis et heroibus poeticis, a widely read work which was a translation of the first two books of Pierre Gautruche's Histoire poétique pour l'intelligence des poètes et des auteurs anciens. Jouvancy also translated into Latin biographies, written by other Jesuits, of the saints of the order, St. Stanislaus Kostka and St. John Francis Regis.

Jouvancy edited a large number of school editions of Latin authors, including Terence, Horace, Juvenal, Persius, Martial, the Metamorphoses of Ovid and the philosophical writings of Cicero, such as De Officiis, Cato Major and Laelius. The text was revised for school use, supplied with footnotes and sometimes a paraphrase, all in Latin. These expurgated editions were frequently reissued well into the 19th century, both in France and other countries. Jouvancy's Institutiones poeticae, published in 1718 and often reprinted, was another work intended for use in teaching. A number of editions also appeared of his Novus apparatus graeco-latinus, cum interpretatione gallica. This work, based on Isocrates, Demosthenes, and the leading Greek authors, was intended to encourage the cultivation of the mother tongue, as well as the study of the two classical languages. Jouvancy also delivered many orations and eulogies, for example on Louis XIV, his family, and his government, on the churches of Paris and the French nation. These were published in two volumes and from 1701 frequently reprinted.

A work of special importance was Jouvancy's Christianis litterarum magistris de ratione discendi et docendi (Paris, 1691). In 1696 he was commissioned by the Fourteenth Congregation of the Jesuits to adapt this work as a guide and method for the classical studies of the members of the Society. After careful examination of the manuscript by a commission of the order, it was published in Florence in 1703 as an official textbook under the title: Magistris scholarum inferiorum Societatis Jesu de ratione discendi et docendi. This edition was the basis of all later ones. In this pioneer work Jouvancy took the first steps in the method for the study of philology which was developed by the great investigators of antiquity of the nineteenth century at the German universities. It stated that Latin was to be the central point of instruction. The art of the teacher was separated into two main divisions: by the example of his own piety and virtue the teacher is to lead the pupil to the knowledge and service of the Creator; he is to bring the pupil to apply himself to his actual studies by fear of humiliation and an honorable spirit of competition. The principles of the De ratione discendi et docendi were used as a standard in all the German Jesuit colleges.

After he was called to Rome, Jouvancy labored on the second half of the fifth part of the history of the Society, which embraced the period 1591-1616. The work was forbidden in France by decrees of Parlement of 22 February and 24 March 1715, because it expressed opinions contravening the royal rights of sovereigns, that is, opposing the royal absolutism of the Bourbons. In Rome as well the work was placed in part on the Index by decree of 29 July 1722, because in some passages it contradicted the papal decree De ritibus Sinensibus ("quibus deletis liber permittitur", which [passages] being destroyed, the book is permitted). According to documents in the archives of the order this part of Jouvancy's book was written before the publication of the papal decree.

Jouvancy died in Rome 29 May 1719.
