= Rivista Storica Italiana =

- Discipline: History
- Language: Italian
- Edited by: Giuseppe Ricuperati

Publication details
- History: 1884-present
- Publisher: Edizioni Scientifiche Italiane (Italia)
- Frequency: Triannually

Standard abbreviations
- ISO 4: Riv. Stor. Ital.

Indexing
- ISSN: 0035-7073
- LCCN: 09011479
- OCLC no.: 243417862

Links
- Journal homepage

Rivista Storica Italiana is an Italian academic journal in the field of history. It was established in 1884. It covers the study of all major fields of history, from ancient to modern, in a regional as well as a global perspective, and is published in Italian three times a year (in Spring, Summer and Winter) by Edizioni Scientifiche Italiane.

The journal has been called "the grand old man of Italian history journals" and has been noted for its wide range in topics and chronology and for its long articles, often 50 pages or more.
