= Istoria della Compagnia di Gesu =

Monumental history of the Society of Jesus by Daniello Bartoli

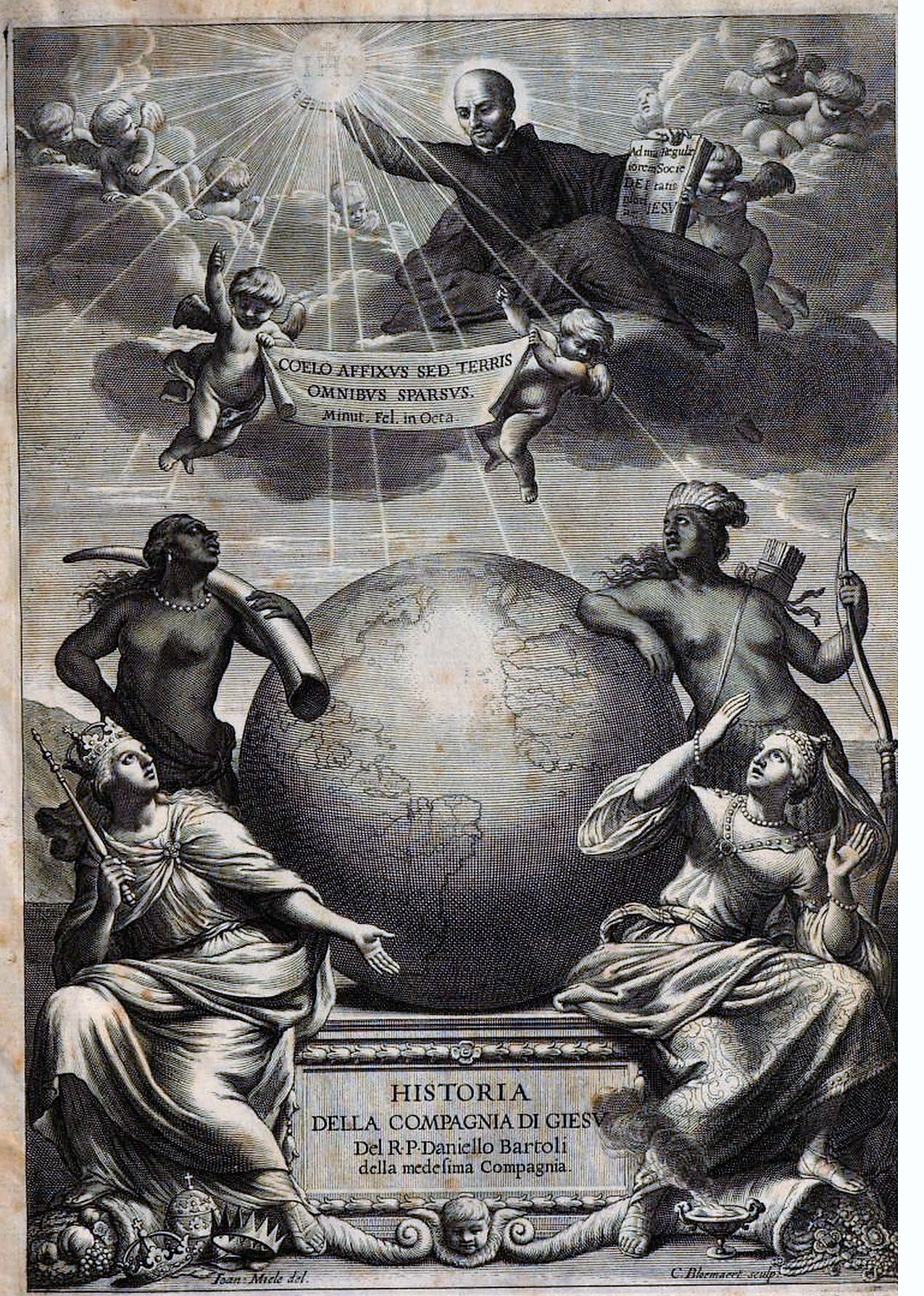
- Historia della Compagnia di Giesu del R. P. Daniello Bartoli della medesima Compagnia. Frontispiece by Jan Miel and Cornelis Bloemaert (Roma: de Lazzeri), 1659
- Author: Daniello Bartoli
- Language: Italian
- Subject: History of the Society of Jesus
- Publication date: 1650-1673
- Publication place: Italy
- Media type: Print

Istoria della Compagnia di Gesu is a monumental six folio-volume work about the history of the Society of Jesus published in Rome in 1650–1673 by the Jesuit historian Daniello Bartoli. It is the most extensive classic of Italian literature, over ten thousand pages long. It begins the centenary history of the Jesuits between 1540 and 1640 with an authoritative if somewhat ponderous biography of the founder Ignatius Loyola.

== Della Vita e dell'Instituto di S. Ignatio ==
The first part of Bartoli's undertaking begins with an introduction to his general plan which after this biography extends to the four corners of the earth. In addition to the library of manuscripts in the Jesuit archives, Bartoli acknowledges the writings of his predecessors, Juan de Polanco, Loyola's secretary, and biographers Pedro de Ribadeneira, Giovanni Pietro Maffei and Niccolò Orlandini. The work is organized in five books, of which the third is a disquisition on the Jesuit Institutes and Constitution. Book 4 is dedicated to the virtues and the death of Ignatius. Book 5 is dedicated to the saint's miracles After the first edition Ignatio De Lazzeri brought out a second edition (Rome, 1659) with the programmatic frontispiece of the art of Jan Miel engraved by Cornelis Bloemaert. The perfectly rendered global quaternity shows the command of the Jesuits on questions of world geography, and their promotion of the shift from the designation of the New World as the Indies to that of America adopted by Bartoli. This theatrical Baroque engraving, which looks forward to the work of Andrea Pozzo is the perfect expression of Jesuit iconography. It shows St. Ignatius shedding a divine light from the order's emblem IHS (Giesu) on a correctly rendered globe surrounded by the symbolic female representations of the world in four parts, Europe, Asia, Africa, America, representing the global dimensions of Bartoli's ambitious historical project. From the clouds the founder holds a volume on which are inscribed the Jesuit motto Ad majorem Dei gloriam and the Regulae Societatis Jesu. It also heralds the Jesuit missions with a decorous classical quote from the Octavianus of Minucius Felix, "Coelo affixus sed terris omnibus sparsus".

== L'Asia ==
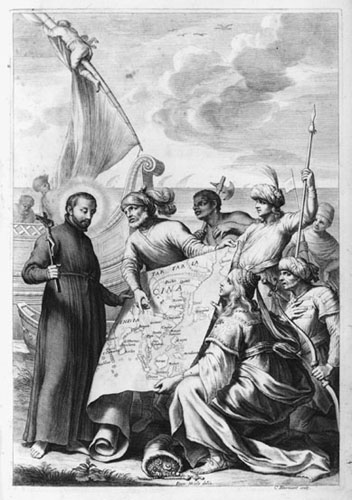
Frontispiece with Francis Xavier by Jan Miel and Cornelis Bloemaert for L'Asia (1667)

Three parts of his Asia narrating the stories of Francis Xavier and the Jesuits in the India, Japan and China.

L'Asia (1653) in eight books, undertakes the story of the missions in India, concentrating on the Portuguese colony in Goa, where Xavier arrived in 1542. Saint Paul's College, Goa was the center of the Asian missionary enterprise with its schools and printing presses where Henrique Henriques wrote Christian texts and the first Tamil dictionary. The work also deals with the mission of Xavier to Japan in 1549 in Book 3 and the story of the first Jesuits in Japan under Cosme de Torres up to 1570 in Book 8. Bartoli narrates the story of the Jesuit mission to Akbar the Great in Fatehpur Sikri of Rodolfo Acquaviva and of his martyrdom in Salcete in 1581 in a smaller work of 1653 Missione al Gran Mogor del p. Ridolfo Acquaviva This was added to the third edition of L'Asia in 1667. It has a fine title frontispiece engraving of Xavier and the Orient by the same artists who illustrated the second edition of the life of the founder in 1659.

Il Giappone (1660) in five books was issued in two folio volumes. It is an extensive history of the Jesuit Kirishitan mission in Japan from the successes during the Sengoku period through its annihilation enforced by the Tokugawa shogunate beginning the Sakoku period. Book 1 and 2 recounts the flourishing missions in Japan of the sixteenth century during the rule of Oda Nobunaga and Toyotomi Hideyoshi under Francisco Cabral and Alessandro Valignano and the Nanban trade trading monopoly the Jesuits secured in Nagasaki. Notable linguist missionaries such as Luís Frois and João Rodrigues and daimyō converts, such as Ōtomo Sōrin are featured as well as the Tensho Embassy to Rome. The eradication of the Japanese Kirishitan begins in 1597 with the crucifixion of the Twenty-six Martyrs of Japan under Hideyoshi beginning Bartoli's martyrology of Japanese Catholics recounted in Books 3 and 4 under the first three Tokugawa shoguns. In book 5 the Jesuit Cristovao Ferreira, subject of Shūsaku Endō's novel Silence (1966), apostasizes. This is the source of Martin Scorsese's film of the same name.

La Cina (1663) recounts the intellectual and intercultural adventure of the Jesuit missions in China centering around the eminent Jesuit Sinologists Michele Ruggieri and Matteo Ricci and their successors at the imperial court. It is divided into four books.

== L'Europa ==
As a universal history of the first Jesuit century Bartoli announces in his introduction to the first volume a plan to cover the world in its four corners (see the iconographic illustration) whereby the seated Orient and Europe would be followed by Africa and the Americas yet standing. After the epic of the Asia Bartoli turns his pen to his Europa with the dramatic story of the English missions, L'Inghilterra (1667) featuring Thomas Pounde, Edmund Campion, Robert Persons, John Gerard, Robert Southwell and Henry Garnet and their connections to the Throckmorton Plot, the Babington Plot under Elizabeth I and the Gunpowder Plot under James VI and the vicissitudes of the aristocratic Recusant community to whom they ministered. The English College of Rome and the Jesuit schools on the Continent for English Catholics, such as the Colleges of St Omer, Bruges and Liege are at the center of his institutional interests.

The last history he completed narrates the auspicious Renaissance beginnings of the Italian Society of Jesus in L'Italia, prima parte dell'Europa (1673) from Loyola's arrival in Rome in 1537 up to the election of the third Jesuit general Francis Borgia in 1565. This includes much early institutional history already in the biography of the founder, as well as the origins of Jesuit education in the Jesuit college of Messina. The Jesuits fortunes at the major Renaissance courts are recounted as well as the "vocationes illustres" in Padua in 1559 of Antonio Possevino and Achille Gagliardi and his brothers, the second generation who would confirm the Italian leadership of the Society under Claudio Acquaviva.

== Degli Uomini e dei Fatti della Compagnia di Gesu: Memorie storiche ==
By the time he produced his last history, after nearly three decades of writing, Bartoli was 65. Seeing that his historiographical commitment to Jesuit history in the four corners of the world was beyond him, the elderly Bartoli assembled a chronicle of the first fifty years of the order's history between 1540 and 1590. This work was left in manuscript at his death in 1685 in the Jesuit archives in Rome until it was published by Giacinto Marietti, Turin printer of the complete edition of Bartoli's works, between 1847 and 1856 in five volumes.

== Modern editions ==
- Giappone. Istoria della Compagnia di Gesù, Spirali, Milano, 1985.
- La Ricreazione del Savio ed. B. Mortara Garavelli, Guanda, Milano, 1992
- La Cina, ed. B. Mortara Garavelli, Milano, Bompiani, 1997. ISBN 8845230082.
- Missione al Gran Mogòr, Roma, Salerno Editrice, 1998.
- La Cina di Daniello Bartoli ed. Wu Yinlan, Urbaniana University Press, Vatican, 2015.
- Daniello Bartoli (2019). Istoria della Compagnia di Gesù. L'Asia, 2 voll. Introduzione di Adriano Prosperi, contributi di Elisa Frei, a cura di Umberto Grassi (Collezione i millenni ed.). Torino: Giulio Einaudi. ISBN 978-88-062-2837-8.
- Frei, Elisa (1984). "Through Daniello Bartoli's Eyes: Francis Xavier in Asia (1653)". Journal of Jesuit Studies. 9 (3): 398–414. doi:10.1163/22141332-09030005.
