= Archconfraternity of Holy Agony =

The Archconfraternity of Holy Agony is a lay association for giving special honour to the mental sufferings of Christ during His Agony in the Garden of Gethsemane. It was founded as a confraternity in 1862, at Valfleury, France, by Antoine Nicolle (1817–90), a Vincentian priest. Joseph A. Komonchak described it as a type of "counterrevolutionary mysticism".

== History ==
The devotion incorporated the wearing of the Red Scapular of the Passion promoted by the Daughters of Charity of Saint Vincent de Paul. In 1847, Pope Pius IX had granted the Vincentians the faculty of blessing the scapular and investing the faithful with it. The Confraternity of the Holy Agony became an Archconfraternity in 1873.

After the death of Nicolle in 1890, the directorship was transferred to the Superior-General of the Vincentians. In 1894, Pope Leo XIII authorized its extension beyond France and re-organized the various confraternities under the center in Paris. The person in charge under the Superior-General was the sub-director.

The chief festival is that of the Prayer of Christ, which occurs on Tuesday of Septuagesima week.

Thomas A. Judge C.M. was a Vincentian priest of the Eastern Province active in preaching parish missions. In 1908, the Superior of the Vincentians in Paris appointed Judge to promote the Holy Agony devotion. which he energetically did for about year with mixed results.

The society has spread all over the world and is mainly based in churches and chapels of the Lazarists and the Daughters of Charity. The central house for the Archconfraternity of the Holy Agony is the Vincentian motherhouse in Paris, and its director is the Vincentian superior general.
