= Venerabile Arciconfraternita della Misericordia di Firenze =

Lay confraternity founded in Florence in the 13th century

Venerabile Arciconfraternita della Misericordia di Firenze (abbreviated Ven. Arc. Misericordia di Florence) is a lay confraternity founded in Florence in the 13th century by St. Peter Martyr with the aim of assisting the needy through evangelical charity. It is today the oldest Brotherhood for the care of the sick and, in general, the oldest private voluntary institution in the world still active since its foundation, dated in 1244 according to the records kept in its archive.

Its lay members, called brothers, still continue to provide part of the infirm transport service in the city, and until April 2006 still wore the traditional black dress (dating back to the seventeenth century), today reduced to use in representation ceremonies due to national regulations inspired by road safety.

The Venerabile Arciconfraternita della Misericordia of Florence was a member of the Compagnia delle Misericordie, a confederation founded by Misericordia di Firenze, Rifredi and Bivigliano. In 2014 she returned to the National Confederation of Misericordie d'Italia, leaving the Compagnia delle Misericordie.

== History ==
=== The origin ===
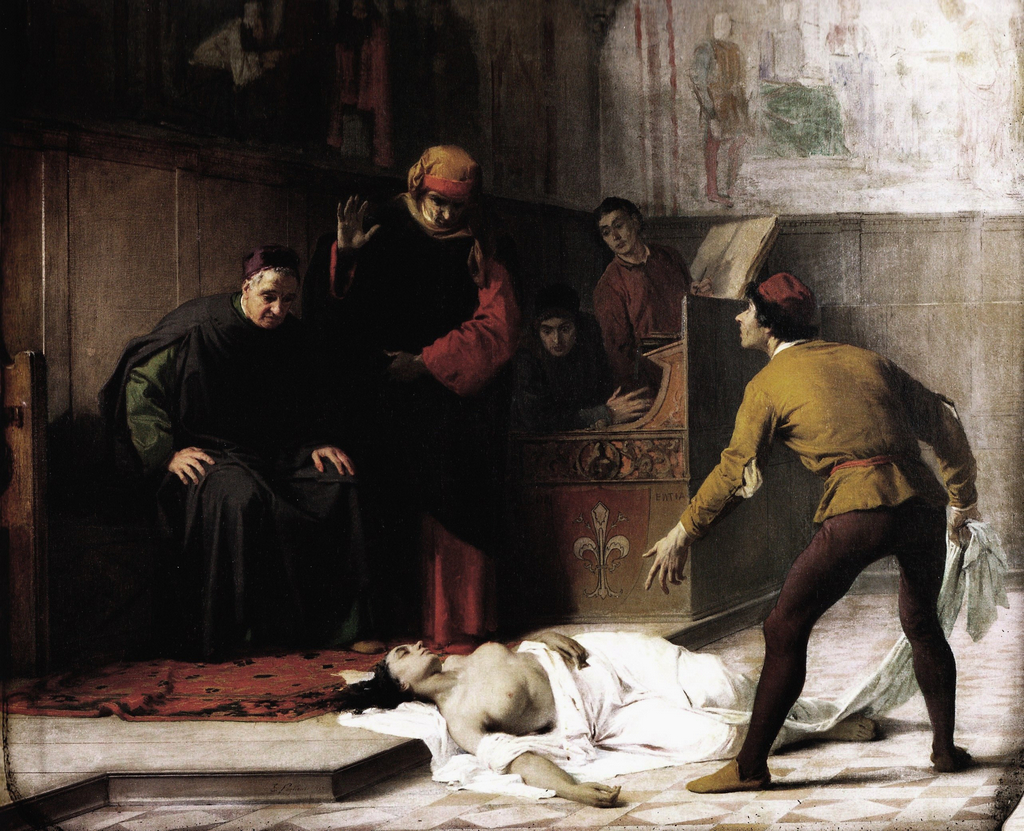
The origin of the Compagnia della Misericordia in Florence, 1857, by Eleuterio Pagliano (Museo Poldi Pezzoli, Milan)

The Confraternity, known to the Florentines simply as La Misericordia, has dedicated itself since the beginning of its history to the transport of the sick to the hospitals of the city, to the collection of alms for poor girls to marry, to the burial of the dead, and to other works of charity.

Around 1244, Peter Martyr founded a group focused on housing the indigent. Based near Orsanmichele, they also cared for pilgrims and travellers at their Ospedale di Santa Maria alle Fonti, nicknamed "del Bigallo", at Fonteviva, and became known as the Compagnia di Santa Maria del Bigallo or simply del Bigallo.

Groups of porters who delivered goods for Florentine merchants began answering calls to transport the sick and injured in wicker stretchers for free, between jobs. They formed the Compagnia della Misericordia. The Confraternity quickly distinguished itself by its constant activity in the transportation of the sick and the burial of the dead, especially during the frequent pestilences. In a short time it grew in numbers and popularity, as well as inevitably wealth, as they began to receive donations and bequests.

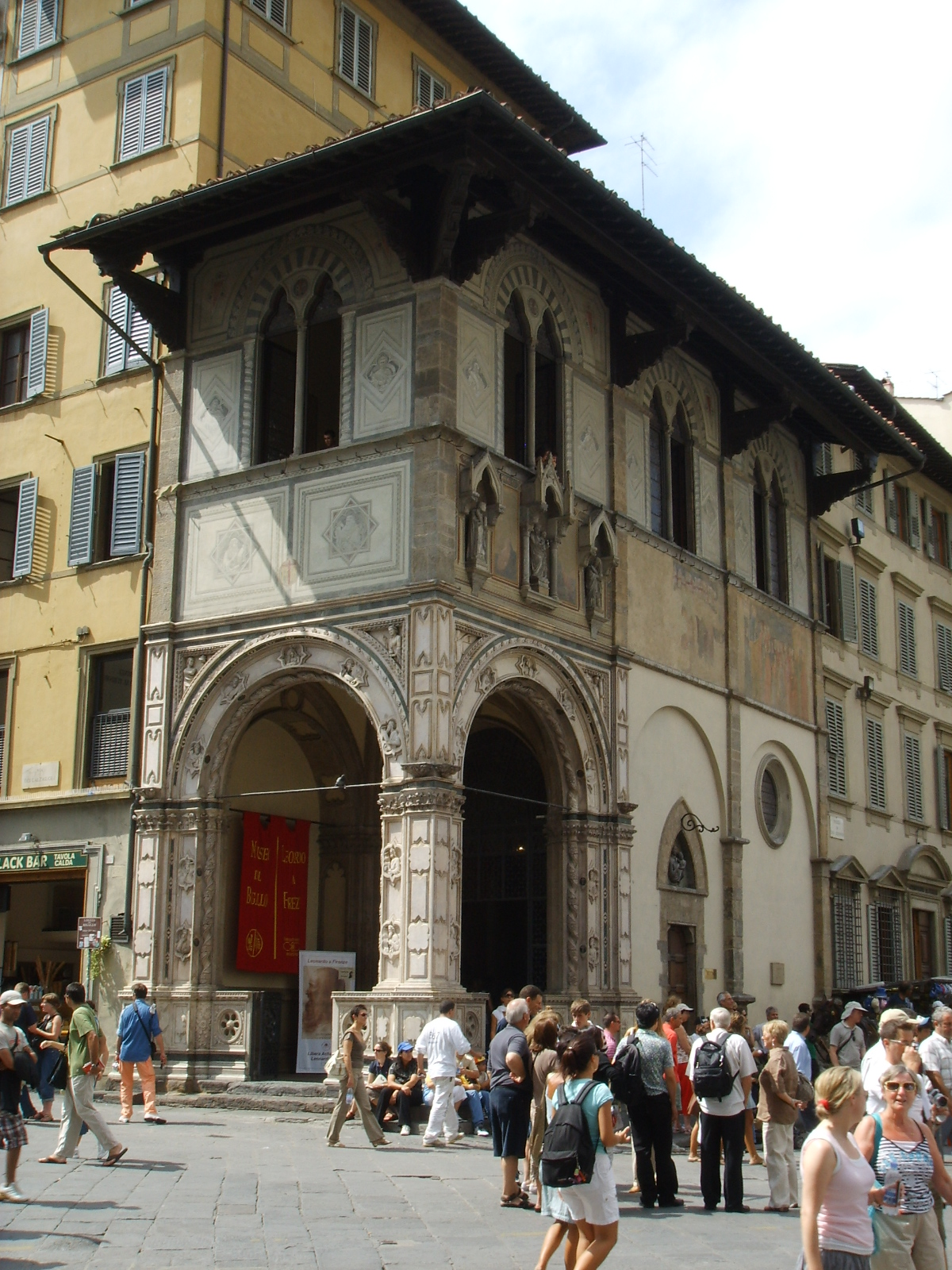
Loggia del bigallo

In the fourteenth century the Confraternity was recognized by the commune as a real public institution in a provision of March 31, 1329 which gave the Brothers the right to elect their leaders (capitan). Around 1352, the Compagnia della Misericordia commissioned the construction of the Loggia del Bigallo. The open loggia served to shelter lost children and unwanted infants who were abandoned to the care of the brotherhood. In 1425, the two groups merged. The building now houses a museum related to the two companies.

During the plague in 1498, the Misericordia took over management of the hospitals on the outskirts of the city.

Grand Duke Peter Leopold, who was a member, protected it during the suppression of the religious associations in 1784.

During World War II, after buildings at both ends of the Ponte Vecchio were destroyed however, the Misericordia rushed ambulances to the bombsites.

== Present day ==
The Misericordia continues to offer a network of free services for needy people: transport to hospitals, home healthcare, lending health equipment, and many others.
