= Rachel Jevon =

English poet

- Born: Broome, Worcestershire, England
- Baptised: 23 January 1627
- Occupation: poet
- Notable work: Exultationis Carmen To the Kings Most Excellent Majesty upon his most Desired Return (1660)
- Spouse: Catherine of Braganza (m. 1662)

Rachel Jevon (1627 – ?) was an English poet of the mid-17th century. She most known for her poem Exultationis Carmen To the Kings Most Excellent Majesty upon his most Desired Return, published in Latin and English versions in 1660.

== Biography ==
Jevon was probably born in Broome, Worcestershire, where she was baptised on 23 January 1627. Her father, Daniell Jevon (died 1654), was the rector of Broom, and Rachel's mother was called Elizabeth, maiden name unknown. According to a petition presented to the king in 1662, Rachel's father was a Royalist supporter during the English Civil War who had been imprisoned for his loyalty to the crown. Very little else is known about her family or life, but her writings suggest she was well educated, as it was rare for women of the period to publish in Latin.

Jevon's poem Exultationis Carmen To the Kings Most Excellent Majesty upon his most Desired Return consisted of 190 lines of iambic pentameter couplets and was written in both English and Latin versions. It was written to celebrate the Stuart Restoration of King Charles II of England, and narrates his royal lineage, his escape to France after defeat at the Battle of Worcester in 1651, his travels on the European continent and his triumphal return to England. It includes allusions to biblical and classical literature and depicts the King as a spirit of peace, the spring, wearing five crowns, as a royal lion, as a royal oak, as Biblical figure King David, as a bridegroom, and as the sun. She claims that she was helpless to resist celebrating the king's return in verse.

According to the subtitle of the poem, it was "presented with her own hand" on 16 August of 1660. It was printed by John Macock.

Early in Charles's reign, after his marriage to Catherine of Braganza in May 1662, Rachel presented two petitions seeking employment as a servant in the royal household. It is unknown if she was appointed to a position.

Her date of death is also unknown.
