= Niccolò Orlandini =

Italian Jesuit author

- Titlepage of Orlandini's Historia Societas Iesu, Antwerp, Martinus Nutius, 1620
- Born: 10 April 1553; Florence, Grand Duchy of Tuscany
- Died: 17 May 1606; Rome, Papal States
- Education: Pontifical Gregorian University
- Occupation: historian

Niccolò Orlandini (April 10, 1553 – May 17, 1606) was an Italian Jesuit author.

== Biography ==
He was born at Florence in 1553.

He entered the Jesuit novitiate in November 7, 1572, became rector of the Jesuit college at Nola and was master of novices at Naples for five years.

He was finally appointed secretary of the Jesuit general Claudio Acquaviva, who in 1558 detailed him to write the history of the Jesuit Order, his master piece.

He died in Rome in 1606.

== Works ==
His history of the Jesuit Order comprises only the generalate of St. Ignatius. It was edited by Sacchini, and appeared under the title Historiæ Societatis Jesu prima pars (Rome, 1614, 1615, 1621; Antwerp, 1620; Cologne, 1620). It is written in the form of annals and based chiefly on a life written by the saint's secretary, de Polanco.

It was continued by Francesco Sacchini, Petrus Possinus, Joseph de Jouvancy and Giulio Cesare Cordara. The sixth and last part, reaching to 1633, was published at Rome in 1758.

Other works are:

- Annuæ litteræ Societatis Jesu, anni 1583-85 (1585–1588)
- Vita Petri Fabri (1617); the same also appeared under the title Forma sacerdotis Apostolici, expressa in exemplo Petri Fabri (1647)
- Tractatus seu Commentarii in Summarium Constitutionum et in regulas communes (1876)
