= Kuperus =

Kuperus and Cuperus are Latinized versions of the common Dutch surname Kuiper (and spelling variations) meaning cooper. This process was most common in the province of Friesland. One family changed the spelling from Cuperus to Couperus in the 19th century.

== Kuperus ==
- Harmen Kuperus (born 1977), Dutch football goalkeeper
- Max Kuperus (born 1936), Dutch astronomer, professor of astrophysics at Utrecht University
  - 9692 Kuperus, a Main Belt asteroid named after him
- Nicola Kuperus (fl. 2003), American musician

== Cuperus ==
- Nicolaas Cupérus (1842–1928), Belgian politician and gymnastics promoter
- Watse Cuperus (1891–1966), Dutch journalist, writer and translator
- Rene Cuperus (1960-), Dutch scholar and columnist

== Couperus ==
- Elisabeth Couperus-Baud (1867–1960), Dutch translator, wife of Louis
- John Ricus Couperus (1816–1902), Dutch lawyer in the Dutch East Indies, father of Louis
- Louis Couperus (1863–1923), Dutch novelist and poet; one of the foremost figures in Dutch literature

== See also ==
- Kuperus (disambiguation)
- Kuipers, variant of surname Kuiper
- Cuypers, variation of the Dutch surname Kuipers
- Kuijpers, variation of the Dutch surname Kuipers
- Kuypers, variation of the Dutch surname Kuipers
