= Kuiper (disambiguation) =

Kuiper is a Dutch surname.

Kuiper may also refer to a number of items named after the Dutch-American astronomer Gerard Kuiper:

- Kuiper (lunar crater), located in the Mare Cognitum
- Kuiper (Martian crater), an impact crater in the Phaethontis quadrangle of Mars
- Kuiper (Mercurian crater), moderate sized, very young crater on Mercury
- Kuiper Airborne Observatory, NASA research facility for infrared astronomy
- Kuiper belt, an area of the Solar System extending past the orbit of Neptune
- Pluto Kuiper Express, a proposed NASA mission replaced by New Horizons
- Project Kuiper, a planned satellite internet constellation by Amazon (now renamed to "Amazon Leo")
- 1776 Kuiper, an asteroid

== See also ==
- Kuipers, a surname
- De Kuyper, a surname
- Quipper (disambiguation)
- Kipper (disambiguation)
