= Franciscus Mercurius van Helmont =

Flemish physician, writer and alchemist (1614-98)

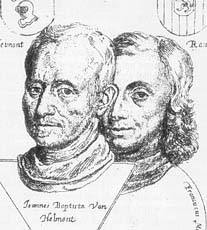
- Franciscus Mercurius (right) with his father Jan Baptist van Helmont from the Ortus medicinae (1648)
- Born: Baptised on 20 October 1614; Vilvoorde, Flemish Brabant
- Died: December 1698; Cölln, Holy Roman Empire
- Scientific career
- Fields: Chemistry

Franciscus Mercurius van Helmont (baptised 20 October 1614 – December 1698) was a Flemish alchemist and writer, the son of Jan Baptist van Helmont. He is now best known for his publication in the 1640s of his father's pioneer works on chemistry, which link the origins of the science to the study of alchemy.

From his early work as a physician, he became a kabbalist and together with Henry More of the Cambridge Platonists he annotated Christian Knorr von Rosenroth's translations of kabbalist texts.

== Contacts and movement ==
He led an itinerant life in wanderings in Europe, an adjective already applied to him by Anthony Ashley-Cooper, 3rd Earl of Shaftesbury in his 1711 Characteristicks of Men, Manners, Opinions, Times. He self-identified as a "wandering eremite".

Franciscus van Helmont had important groups of contacts in the Netherlands, where he knew Adam Boreel and Serrarius, and later in life, in 'the Lantern', the circle around the Rotterdam merchant Benjamin Furly that included John Locke. He was an influence on Franciscus van den Enden, and on the Spanish medical professor Juan de Cabriada. In Amsterdam around 1690 he worked out a theory to support the work Johann Konrad Ammann was doing with deaf people.

He also spent much time in Germany and England. From 1644, when his father died, to 1658, when Leopold I, Holy Roman Emperor ennobled him, he was constantly involved in diplomacy for German princes and their families.

== Life from 1660 ==
In 1661 he was in Kitzingen when he was forcibly taken by soldiers of Philipp Wilhelm, Elector Palatine to Rome and a prison of the Inquisition, where he was tortured and kept for 18 months.

His first published work was a 1667 Latin treatise Alphabeti veri naturalis hebraici brevissima delineatio (usual short English title Alphabet of Nature) on Adamic language, which he equated with Hebrew. He argued that the Hebrew alphabet implicitly gave a pronunciation guide, analogous to a musical notation for the tongue and voice.

He was a friend of Gottfried Leibniz, who wrote his epitaph, and he introduced Leibniz to Christian Knorr von Rosenroth in 1671. Leibniz writing in 1669 took the "Helmontians" seriously, as one of three contending groups in philosophy, the others being the traditionalist followers of Aristotle, and the Cartesians. The Helmontians comprised remaining Paracelsans and those who took the writings of Jan Baptist van Helmont to heart.

He came to England in 1670, meeting the king, Charles II. He was on a diplomatic mission on behalf of Elisabeth of Bohemia, Princess Palatine. At this time he met Robert Boyle, a leading Helmontian chemist.

Through his relationship as physician to Anne Conway, Viscountess Conway, he began to attend Quaker meetings, in 1675. In return he introduced her to kabbalist thought. He was resident at the old Ragley Hall from 1671 until 1679, when she died. Twenty years later, he was a figure in the Keithian Controversy, a schism formed in the Quakers, in which van Helmont took the side of George Keith who broke away. Keith had translated van Helmont's Two Hundred Queries in 1684; it was a work of speculative theology, written in Latin in a simultaneously published version and anonymous until the following year, and van Helmont had hoped for an effect on Quaker belief, at the time still plastic and uncodified. But he encountered serious resistance from George Fox. Keith collaborated on van Helmont's Paradoxal Discourses of 1685, but went to some pains to deny he held the same opinions.

In a A Cabbalistical Dialogue (Latin version first, 1677, in English 1682) he launched a defence of kabbalist metaphysics. He had been closely associated with the Kabbala Denudata of Rosenroth. The Dialogue puts matter and spirit on a continuum, describing matter as a "coalition" of monads. There are various views on the evolution of the concept of "monad", which Conway and Van Helmont shared with Leibniz. Physicist and philosopher Max Bernhard Weinstein found this to be a kind of Pandeism. From the same period, the attributed work Adumbratio Kabbalae Christianae, sometimes included with the Kabbala Denudata as an anonymous essay, purported to be a tract to convert Jews to Christianity, but equally served as an introduction to Christian Kabbalist views, and the identification of Adam Kadmon of the Lurianic Kabbalah with Christ.

In his last years he was in Germany, and continued to work closely with Leibniz. It has been argued that Leibniz may have written the final book to appear under van Helmont's name, the Quaedam praemeditatae et consideratae cogitationes super quattuor capita libri primi Moisis (Amsterdam 1697), translated in English in 1701 as Premeditate and Considerate Thoughts, on the early chapters of the Book of Genesis.
