= Eric Walten =

Eric Walten (1663–1697) was a Dutch Enlightenment thinker and pamphleteer, notably accused of blasphemy and of secretly following the philosophical thinking of Benedict Spinoza in the 1690s.

Little information survives of Walten's life. He told the court that he was born in Ham, Munsterland, now in Germany. The Dutch scholar Wiep van Bunge suggests that Walten may have been of English descent. He lived in Utrecht until 1685, and from 1688 in The Hague and Rotterdam.

Though influenced by Enlightenment writers such as Descartes and Spinoza in his philosophical thought, Walten denied the latter as his primary political influence and professed to admire Juan de Mariana as the greatest writer on the powers and responsibilities of kings. He was one of the most ardent defenders of the Glorious Revolution, justifying the expedition of William of Orange to England in many pamphlets.

Walten's fate as a controversialist was sealed when his vigorous defense of Balthasar Bekker against the various accusations against him invited a legal prosecution on blasphemy charges against himself. Most damagingly, he had called the Reformed Synod a lunatic asylum ('Een Sothuys van de gekken') for its attack against Bekker. Walten died in prison, probably by suicide, while awaiting trial.

According to the historians Margaret Jacob, Wiep van Bunge, and Silvia Berti, Walten belonged to a partly clandestine group of Holland Enlightenment philosophers that were strongly influenced by Adrian Koerbagh and Lodewijk Meyer.
