= Frans Kuiper (disambiguation) =

Frans Kuiper, along with similar spellings, may refer to:

- F. B. J. Kuiper – Dutch linguist (1907–2003)
- Frans Kuyper – Dutch Socinian writer (1629–1691)
- Frans Kuijper – Dutch water polo player (1900–1987)
- Franciscus Kuijpers – Dutch chess player (1941–2024)
- Francis Kuipers – British-Dutch composer, guitarist and ethno-musicologist

== See also ==
- Kuiper
- Kuipers
