= The Light upon the Candlestick =

Anonymous Christian pamphlet (1662)

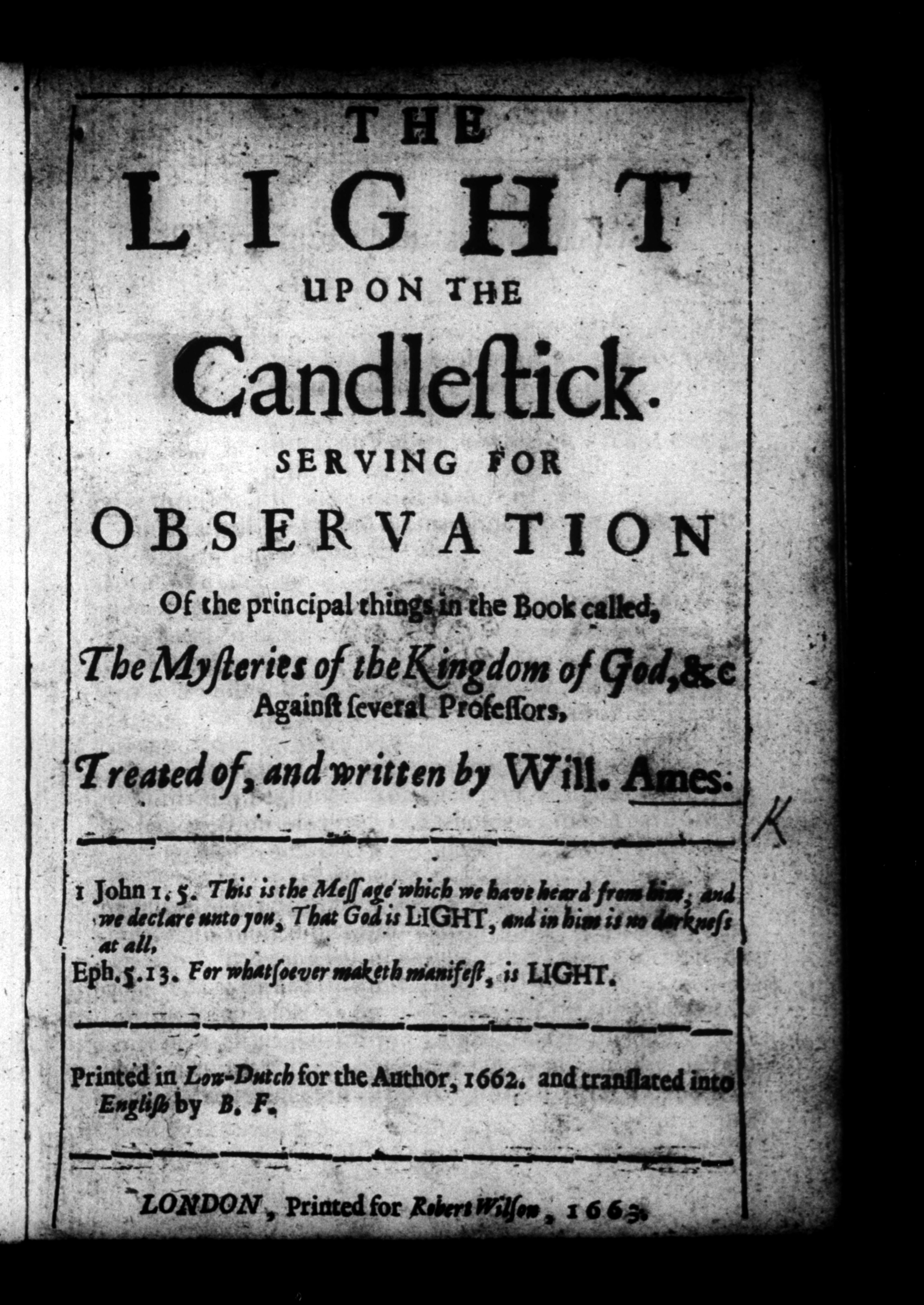
- Title page of first English edition
- Author: Adam Boreel (probable); Peter Balling (supposed); William Ames (attributed)
- Language: Latin translated to Low-Dutch translated to English
- Subject: Finding the Light of God within
- Genre: Christian mysticism
- Publisher: Robert Wilson, London
- Publication date: 1662
- Publication place: Holland and England
- English publication date: 1663
- Media type: Tract
- Text: The Light upon the Candlestick at Internet Archive

The Light upon the Candlestick is an anonymous mystical tract published in Holland in 1662. Translated into English in 1663, it became a popular text among English Quakers.

The tract promotes the idea that the Light of God can be found within each individual. Personal experience of the Divine is the only authentic path to Truth.

The text has been attributed to Adam Boreel, with Peter Balling and Benjamin Furly serving as its original translators. The text has also been attributed to William Ames, as the book defends Ames' theological positions against the Collegiants which were his opponents.

== History ==
Authorship of the text is unclear. It was possibly originally composed in Latin as Lucerna Super Candelabrum by Adam Boreel, translated into Low-Dutch by Peter Balling in 1662 and into English by B.F. (Benjamin Furly) in 1663. The English title page reads,

“The LIGHT upon the Candlestick. Serving for Observation of the principal things in the Book called; The Mysteries of the Kingdom of God, &c against several Professors, Treated of, and written by Will. Ames…Printed in Low-Dutch for the Author, 1662. and translated into English by B.F.”

This has led to the supposition that William Ames was the author of The Light upon the Candlestick, but the wording means that The Light upon the Candlestick agrees in principle with the work The Mysteries of the Kingdom of God by William Ames. As the title page says it was printed for the Author, it is likely that the tract was printed for the Author of The Mysteries of the Kingdom of God, William Ames, to support his position “against several Professors” of the Collegiants with whom he was in disagreement.

In the mid-seventeenth century there was a Quaker community in Holland seeking sanctuary from persecution in England. There they came into contact with the radical Protestant sect of the Collegiants. William Ames was a Quaker minister who, after being imprisoned for his beliefs in Ireland, moved to Amsterdam, where he preached with John Stubbs. William Ames zealously preached to the Collegiants and they were initially in accord although later they fell out.

Adam Boreel was a Dutch theologian and Hebrew scholar, a leader of the Collegiants and a friend of Baruch Spinoza; Peter Balling was a member of the Collegiants; Benjamin Furly, associated with John Locke, George Fox and William Penn, was an English Quaker merchant then living in Rotterdam.

== Contents ==
The Light upon the Candlestick proposes that God is the origin of all knowledge. We can only be aware of God’s working in the world because we have a prior knowledge of God. One can become aware of the Light of God only by seeking inward.

“This Light is the inward ear by which alone, and by no other, the voice of God that is the Truth, can he heard.”

Following this Inward light will result in Union with God.

== See also ==
- Baruch Spinoza
- Collegiants
- Divine light
- Quakers
