= Balthasar Bekker =

Dutch minister and author

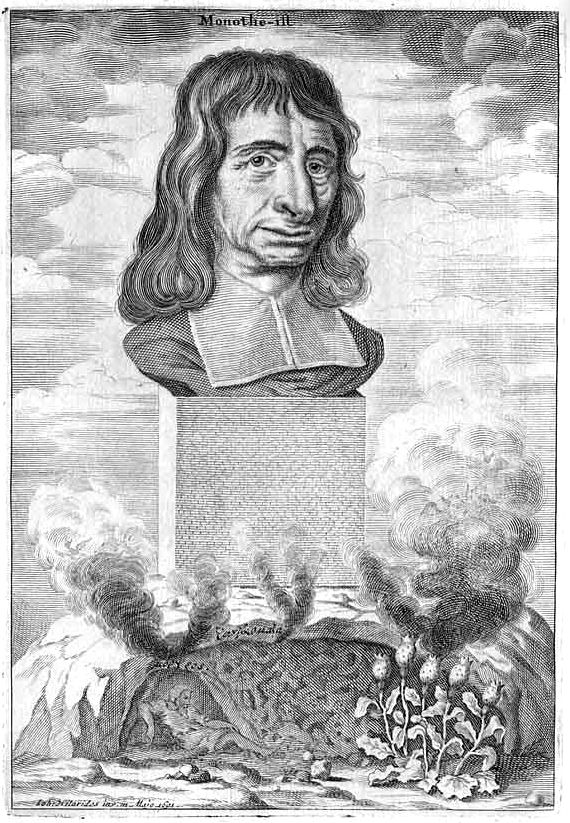
Balthasar Bekker by J. Hilarides (1691)

Balthasar Bekker (20 March 1634 – 11 June 1698) was a Dutch minister and author of philosophical and theological works. Opposing superstition, he was a key figure in the end of the witchcraft persecutions in early modern Europe. His best-known work is De Betoverde Weereld (1691), or The World Bewitched (1695). He was also known for his travels to England and France

== Life ==
Bekker was born in Metslawier (Dongeradeel) as the son of a German pastor from Bielefeld. He was educated at Groningen, under Jacob Alting, and at Franeker. Becoming the rector of the local Latin school, he was appointed to his satisfaction in 1657 as a pastor in Oosterlittens (Littenseradiel), and started as one of the first to preach on Sunday afternoon.

From 1679, he worked in Amsterdam, after being driven from Friesland. In 1683, he traveled to England and France. In two months, Bekker visited London, Cambridge, Oxford, Paris, and Leuven, with a great interest in the art of fortification.

== Works ==
An enthusiastic disciple of Descartes, he wrote several works on philosophy and theology, which by their freedom of thought aroused considerable hostility. In his book De Philosophia Cartesiana Bekker argued that theology and philosophy each had their separate terrain and that Nature can no more be explained through Scripture than can theological truth be deduced from Nature.

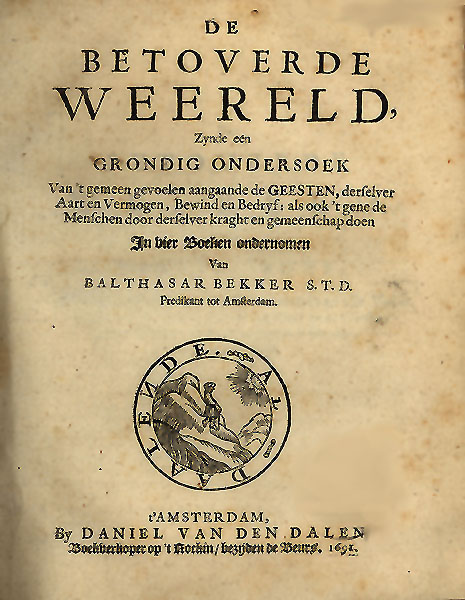
Cover of De betoverde weereld

His application of Cartesian metaphysics and reproach of Biblical literalism put him at odds with the Dutch Reformed Church.

His best known work was De Betoverde Weereld (1691), or The World Bewitched (1695), in which he examined critically the phenomena generally ascribed to spiritual agency. He attacked the belief in sorcery and "possession" by the devil. Indeed, he questioned the devil's very existence. He applied the doctrine of accommodation to account for the biblical passages traditionally cited on the issue. Bekker argued that practices decried as witchcraft were little more than fatuous but harmless superstitions. The book had a sensational effect and was one of the key works of the Early Enlightenment in Europe. It was almost certainly the most controversial.

The publication of the book led to Bekker's deposition from the ministry. The orthodox among Dutch theologians saw his views as placing him among notorious atheists: Thomas Hobbes, Adriaan Koerbagh, Lodewijk Meyer and Baruch Spinoza. Eric Walten came to his defence, attacking his opponents in extreme terms. Bekker was tried for blasphemy, maligning the public Church, and spreading atheistic ideas about Scripture. Some towns banned the book, but Amsterdam and the States of Holland never did, continuing his salary, without formally stripping him of his post.

The World Bewitched is now considered interesting as an early study in comparative religion.

Margaret Jacob coined the term "Radical Enlightment" with regards to Bekker, the brothers Johan and Pieter de la Court, and Baruch de Spinoza, that affirmed the equality of all men based on their common reason. The definition was subsequently popularized by Jonathan Israel. Jacob defined them as "pantheist, freemasons and repubblicana" characterized by a Radical criticism of religion that "anticipated Dutch 'Patriots' and Enlightment philosophers in the late eighteenth century "

== Later life ==
In July 1698 he was elected a Fellow of the Royal Society of London. He died in Amsterdam.

== Selected publications ==
- De philosophia Cartesiana admonitio candida & sincera. Bekker, Balth. / Vesaliae / 1668
- The world bewitch'd; or, An examination of the common opinions concerning spirits: their nature, power, administration, and operations. As also, the effects men are able to produce by their communication. Divided into IV parts; Bekker, Balthasar / Translated from a French copy, approved of and subscribed by the author's own hand / printed for R. Baldwin in Warwick-lane / 1695
