= Petrus Serrarius =

Dutch millenarian theologian, writer and merchant

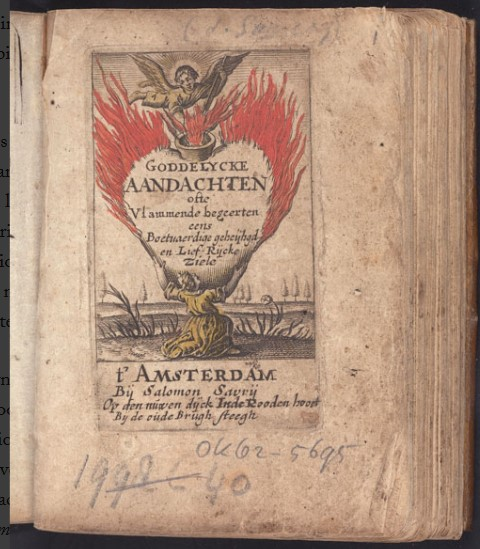
Title page of Petrus Serrarius: Goddelycke aandachten ofte vlammende begeerten, Amsterdam, Salomon Savrij, 1653. The image is an example of Catholic emblematics showing God's love (amor divinus) being poured from above into an enormous heavy burning heart. A translation in Dutch of Herman Hugo’s Pia Desideria (Divine Meditations).

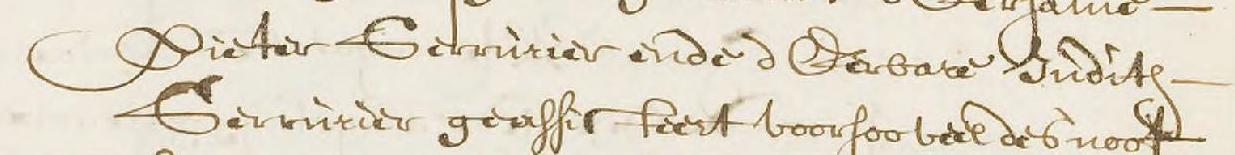
Mention of "Pieter Serrurier" and his daughter "Judith Serrurier" in a legal document by Amsterdam notary Jacob Pont, 8 September, 1662.

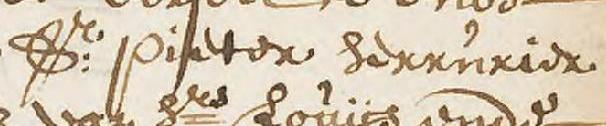
Mention of "Pieter Serrurier" in the estate inventory of his daughter Judith by Amsterdam notary Jacob Pont, November 15, 1662.

Pieter Serrurier: Notarial Archives Amsterdam. Inventory of the legacy of his deceased daughter Judith by Amsterdam notary Jacob Pont, November 15, 1662. Mention of Louis and Joseph Serrurier, executors.

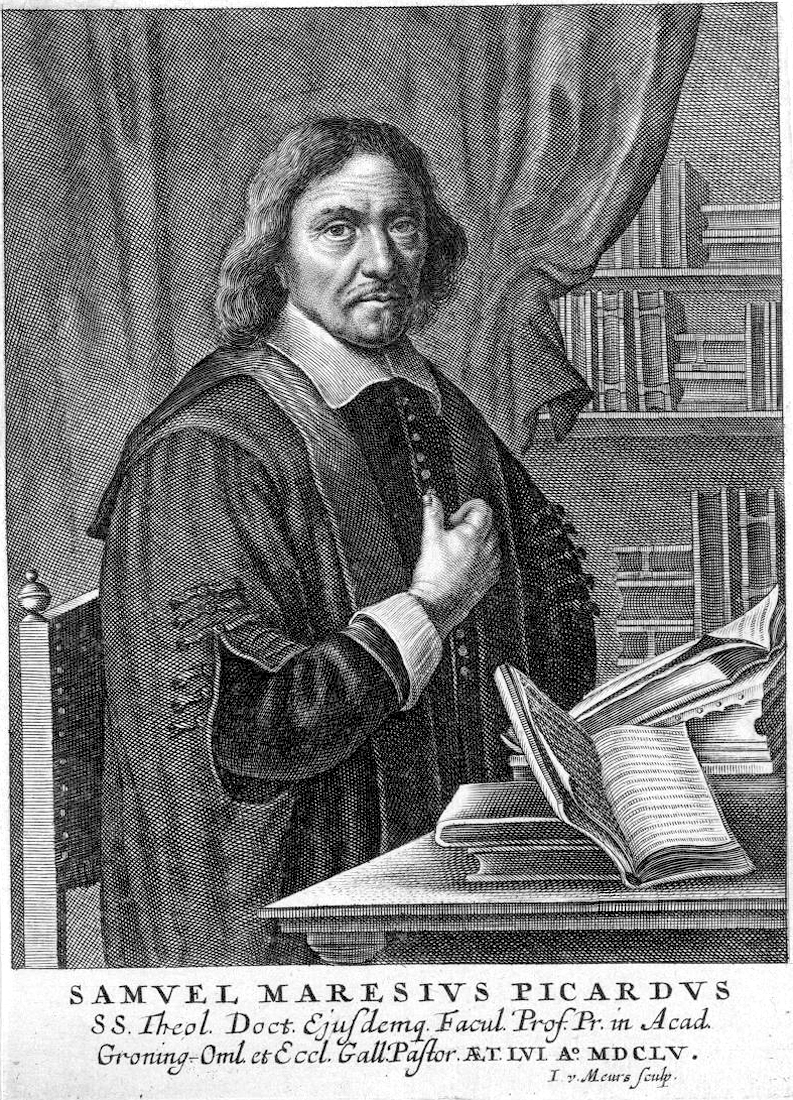
Samuel Maresius (1599-1673), Serrarius' coauthor and opponent.

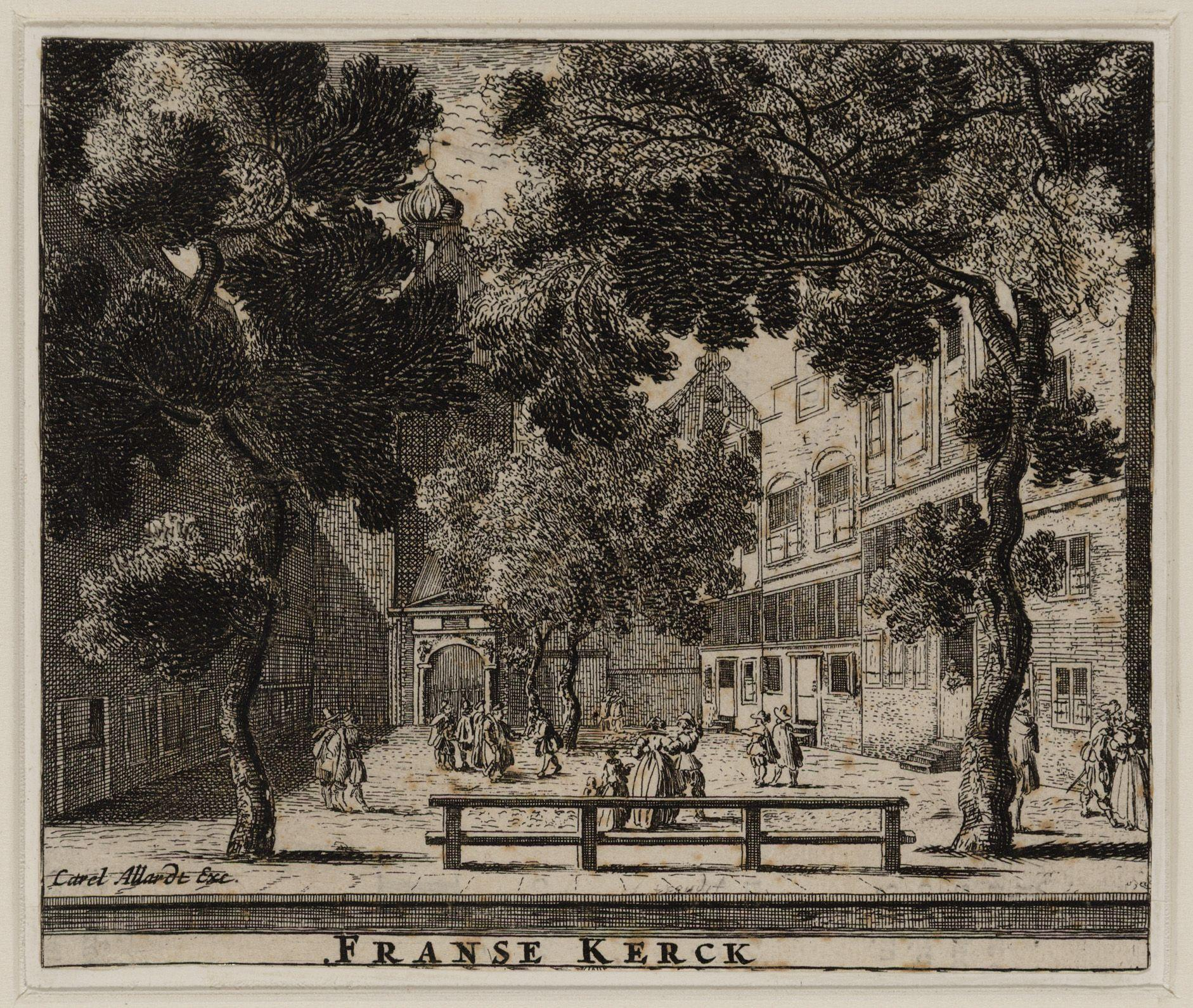
Carel Allard (1648-1709): Walloon Church, Amsterdam, engraving, 1675-1708. Serrarius was buried here on October 1, 1669.

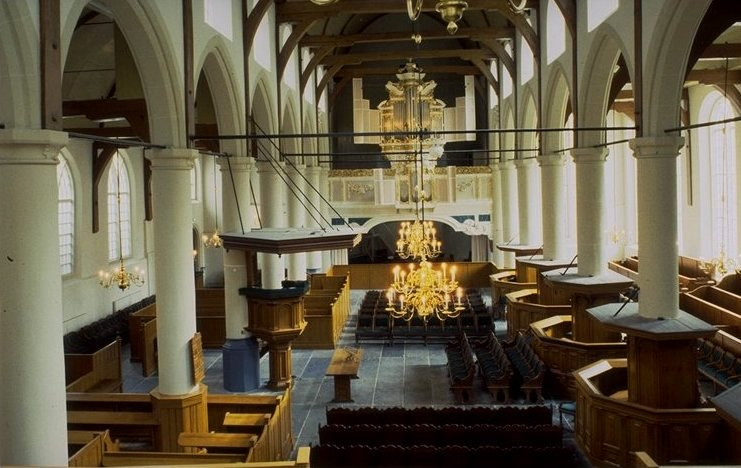
Walloon Church, Amsterdam, modern interior.

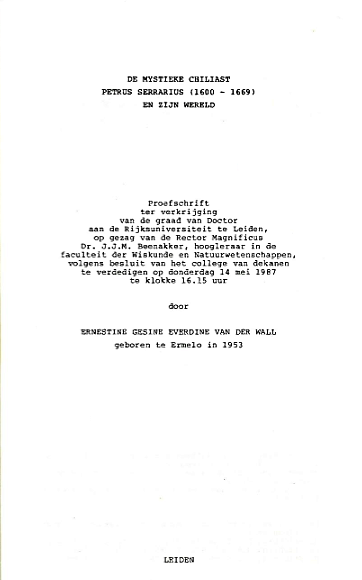
Ernestine G.E. van der Wall: De mystieke chiliast Petrus Serrarius (1660-1669) en zijn wereld, Leiden, 1987. Dutch PhD thesis. (Translated title: "The mystical chiliast Petrus Serrarius (1660-1669) and his world)

Petrus Serrarius (Peter Serrarius, Pieter Serrurier, Pierre Serrurier, Pieter Serrarius, Petro Serario, Petrus Serarius; 1600, London – buried October 1, 1669, Amsterdam) was a millenarian theologian, writer, and also a wealthy merchant, who established himself in Amsterdam in 1630, and was active there until his death. He was born "into a well-to-do Walloon merchant family by name of Serrurier in London." He has been called "the dean of the dissident Millenarian theologians in Amsterdam".

He studied at Christ Church, Oxford from 1617 to 1619, and at the Walloon College in Leiden from 1620 to 1623. The French speaking college was then a part of the new Leiden University, where Serrarius met John Dury, and they remained closely associated, right up to Serrarius' own death in 1669.

== Circle ==
In Amsterdam he associated, on the one hand, with the Collegiants Adam Boreel, and Galenus Abrahamsz, and their sect; and, on the other hand, also with the Portuguese Jews settling there at the time, among them Menasseh ben Israel and Benedictus de Spinoza. He was a correspondent of Samuel Hartlib. His involvement with Jews and Judaism led him to the study of Kabbalah and Gematria, and later to a belief in Sabbatai Zevi's messianic claims.

== Views and contacts ==
He published works on the millennium. He was one of the first followers of the Silesian mystic and millenarian Jacob Boehme in Amsterdam.

As well as being a philo-semite, interested greatly in the issue of the Lost Tribes, he was on good terms with the Amsterdam Quakers, and had been in contact with William Ames. He corresponded also with the London Baptist Minister Henry Jessey.

=== Friendship with Benedictus de Spinoza ===
Nadler often mentions Serrarius in his biography of Benedictus de Spinoza. Serrarius was very important to Spinoza because Serrarius brought him into contact with the Amsterdam chiliasts and Quakers as well as with Henry Oldenburg. Serrarius may have known Spinoza from the group of Amsterdam Collegiants and may have introduced him to the Quaker William Ames. Oldenburg may have heard from Serrarius about Spinoza and he visited Spinoza in Rijnsburg in mid-July 1662, which led to a strong friendship. Serrarius had attended chemical experiments of Johann Rudolph Glauber in Amsterdam with Franciscus van den Enden, the teacher of Spinoza. Maybe Spinoza was there too.

Oldenburg asked Spinoza to send him a copy of his book Renati Descartes principia philosophiae, more geometrico demonstrata via Serrarius. Serrarius acted as postmaster in Amsterdam and courier to England for Spinoza. Later Oldenburg wrote that he had heard from Serrarius that Spinoza was doing well and that he had not forgotten. While Spinoza was in Amsterdam for a few weeks, he spoke to Serrarius. Oldenburg expected a package via Serrarius in Amsterdam, and hoped that Spinoza would send a manuscript with his thoughts on the Bible. Serrarius spread among Protestants in Amsterdam the message that Sabbatai Zevi was the Messiah.

== Controversy ==
Initially an orthodox Calvinist, he had left his church before coming to Amsterdam around 1630. He attacked the views of Moses Amyraut, who had in Du règne de mille ans ou de la Prospérité de l'Église (1654) taken up a position against the millenarians of the time. Serrarius replied with Assertion du règne de mille ans (1657). He in turn was attacked by Samuel Maresius (Samuel Des Marets), a pupil of Franciscus Gomarus. Maresius attempted to undermine the appeal to the work of Joseph Mede made by Serrarius.

Serrarius was also one of the loudest critics of Lodewijk Meyer after the anonymous publication of the latter's Philosophia S. Scripturae Interpres, Exercitatio paradoxa (Philosophy interpreting Sacred Scripture, an exercise in paradox) in 1666, which caused a big controversy in Dutch and wider European Reformed circles at the time.

== Publications ==
Including

- 1653: (in Dutch) Goddelycke aandachten ofte vlammende begeerten, Amsterdam Salomon Savrij, 1653. Reprinted in 1657 by Christoffel Luyken
- 1657, as Pierre Serrurier: (in French) Assertion Du Règne De Mille Ans, ou de la Prosperité De L'Eglise De Christ en la Terre : Pour servir de Response au Traitté de Monsieur Moyse Amyraut sur ce même suject. Descouverant Le triste Prejugé qui possede aujourd'huy la pluspart des Eglises contre le Regne du Seigneur de toute la Terre, Amsterdam Luycken, 1657.
- 1661: (in Dutch) Van den waere wegh tot God, Alkmaar: Jacob Pietersz. Moerbeeck, 1661
- 1658 with John Dury and Henry Jessey: (in English) An information concerning the present state of the Jewish nation in Europe and Judea : wherein the footsteps of Providence preparing a way for their conversion to Christ, and for their deliverance from captivity are discovered, London, printed by R.W. for Thomas Brewster, 1658.
- 1662:
  - (in English) An awakening warning to the vvofull vvorld : by a voyce in three nations, uttered in a brief dissertation concerning that fatal and to be admired conjunction of all the planets..., Amsterdam, 1662. English version of Van den waere wegh tot God, Amsterdam, unknown publisher
  - (in Dutch) Naerder bericht, wegens die groote conjunctie ofte t'samenkomste van allen planeten, in het teecken des hemels, ghenaemt de Schutter, te geschieden den 1/11 December anno 1662. Waer-inne uyt de natuer der sake ... bewesen wort, dat de tweede komste J. Christi ... voor handen zy., Amsterdam, Broer and Ian Appelaer, 1662
- 1663: (in Latin) Vox Clamantis in Babylone praeparate viam Domino, i.e. Brevis dissertatio de fatali et admiranda illa planetarum in uno eodemque signo, igneae triplicitatis ultimo, conjunctione. Que ... clare evincitur, illustrem illum Jesu Christi adventum imminere, Amsterdam, Cunrad, 1663
- 1665:
  - (in English) The last letters, to the London-merchants and faithful ministers concerning the further proceedings of the conversion and restoration of the Jews : with most strange and wonderful miracles performed by the holy captain general of the wandring Israelites..., [London] G. Cotton, 1665.
  - with Samuel Des Marets (Samuel Maresius): (in Latin) De Judæorum I. Universali Conversione, II. In Patriam Reductione, & III. Cultus Levitivi Restitutione; Ut Et IV. De Antichristi ante finalem Mundi interitum Abolitione, Disputatio Adversus Libellum ... , Amsterdam Cunrad 1665
