= QUIP =

QUIP or quip may refer to:

- Quip (software), a collaborative productivity software suite for mobile and the Web
- Quip (company), an American oral hygiene startup
- Quip (wit), a form of wit
- Acyl-homoserine-lactone acylase, an enzyme also known as QuiP
- Exxon Qwip, one of the first commercial fax machines
- Quad in-line package, or QUIP, an electronic device package

== See also ==
- Quipper (disambiguation)
- QUIPS, quality measurement
