= Quipper =

Quipper may refer to:

- someone who makes quips
- Quipper (company), an education technology company
- Quipper (programming language), used in quantum programming
- Quipper (Dungeons & Dragons), a fish-like monster in Dungeons & Dragons game

== See also ==
- Kuiper (disambiguation)
- Kipper (disambiguation)
- Quip (disambiguation)
