= Burnyeat =

Burnyeat is a surname. Notable people with the surname include:

- John Burnyeat (c. 1631–1690), English Quaker
- Myles Burnyeat (1939–2019), English historian of philosophy
- William Burnyeat (1874–1916), British politician
