= De Cuyper =

De Cuyper is a surname, equivalent to English Cooper. Notable people with the surname include:

- Alphons De Cuyper (1887–1950), Belgian sculptor and painter
- Katrien De Cuyper (1967–c. 1991), Belgian homicide victim
- Maxim De Cuyper (b. 2000), Belgian footballer
- Norbert De Cuyper (b. 1943), Belgian politician
- Simon De Cuyper (b. 1986), Belgian triathlete

== See also ==
- De Kuyper
