= Adam Boreel =

Dutch theologian and Hebrew scholar

Adam Boreel (2 November 1602, Middelburg – 20 June 1665, Sloterdijk, Amsterdam) was a Dutch theologian and Hebraist. He was one of the founders of the Amsterdam College; the Collegiants were also often called Boreelists. Others involved in the Collegiants were William Ames, Daniel van Breen, Michiel Coomans, Jacob Otto van Halmael and the Mennonite Galenus Abrahamsz de Haan.

== Biography ==
Boreel was ordained into the Dutch Reformed Church, but broke away. In Ad legem et testimonium (1645), he argued the sola scriptura position that no religious authority other than the Bible should be acknowledged. He was attacked by Johann Hornbeek (Apologia pro ecclesia Christiana non apostatica 1647), and by Samuel Maresius.

Boreel's associates included Peter Serrarius, a fellow millenarian, Baruch Spinoza, who moved with the Collegiants after exclusion from the Amsterdam Jewish community, and Henry Oldenburg, a correspondent. Boreel was close also to John Dury. They were a fringe group, but are considered important as representative of the 'Third Force', trying to reconcile religious orthodoxy with scientific scepticism. In the early 1660s the Collegiants became harder to distinguish from other movements, of Quakers, anti-Trinitarians, and Socinians. Adam Boreel is reputed to be the author of Lucerna Super Candelabrum (The Light upon the Candlestick, 1663), a mystical text accepted by both the Collegiants and the Quakers.

== Interest in Judaism ==
Boreel took a close interest in Judaism, working with Menasseh Ben Israel and Judah Leon Templo. Among his projects with the latter were a reconstruction of Solomon's Temple and editions of the Mishnah.

== Sources ==
- Ernestine G.E. van der Wall, 'Without Partilitie Towards All Men': John Durie on the Dutch Hebraist Adam Boreel, pp. 145–150 in J. van den Berg and E.G.E. van den der Wall, eds., Jewish-Christian Relations in the Seventeenth Century, Leiden: Kluwer, 1988
- Ernestine van der Wall, The Dutch Hebraist Adam Boreel and the Mishnah Project, LIAS 16. (1989) 239–63, online scan
- Robert Iliffe, Jesus Nazarenus Legislator: Adam Boreel's defence of Christianity, in Heterodoxy, Spinozism and Free Thought in Early Eighteenth Century Europe, S. Berti, F. Charles-Daubert and R. Popkin, eds., (Kluwer: Amsterdam) 1996, 375–96
