= William Edmundson =

Founder of Quakerism in Ireland (1627–1712)

- Church: Religious Society of Friends

Personal details
- Born: 1627 Little Musgrave, Westmorland, England
- Died: 1712 (aged 84–85)
- Denomination: Quakerism (Religious Society of Friends)
- Spouse: Margaret Staniforth (m. 1652, d. 1689); Mary Strangman
- Children: 8

William Edmundson or Edmondson (1627–1712) was the founder of Quakerism in Ireland.

== Early life ==
Edmundson was born in Little Musgrave, Westmorland, England in 1627. His parents died when he was young, and so he was raised by an uncle. He was apprenticed as a carpenter at York, and after completion, he joined the Parliamentary Army during the English Civil War. He went to Scotland in 1650. He also took part in the Battle of Worcester. While serving in the military, he was first introduced to Quakerism while stationed at Chesterfield. He was discharged and eventually went to live in County Antrim, Ireland.

== Quakerism ==
Edmundson established the first Meeting House in Lurgan, Ireland in 1654. He was imprisoned several times, but was released thereafter.

After this first establishment, Edmundson spent the rest of his life building the Society of Friends in Ireland. He lived most of his life in the once Quaker village of Rosenallis, Co Laois (aka County Leix, aka Queen's County), where he had a residence at Tineal House. Edmundson also visited America and debated the Protestant theologian Roger Williams in Rhode Island (New England) in 1672 with several other Quakers, and Williams was particularly offended by Edmundson's perceived rudeness. The debate was published in Williams' George Fox Digged out of his Burrowes. Edmundson's life as a Quaker is documented in his journal titled "A Journal of the Life, Travels, Sufferings, and Labour of Love of William Edmundson".

== Family ==
Edmundson in 1652 married Margaret Staniforth or Stanford who died in 1689. He then married Mary Strangman who survived him. He had nine children, Thomas, Mary, William, Samuel, Hindrance, Susanna, Anna, Tryal. He obviously did not approve of some of them as his will refers to "My unhappy son William, my unruly son Samuel, my foolish and disobedient daughter Hindrance, my rebellious daughter Anne".

== See also ==
- List of abolitionist forerunners

== Bibliography ==
Bibliography
