= Johannes Bredenburg =

Johannes Bredenburg (1643–1691) was a Rotterdam wine merchant and weaver who was a member of the Collegiants. The philosopher Spinoza had joined the Collegiants and his ideas became the source of a division in the membership so that they broke into two parties. The Spinozist party was led by Bredenburg and the opponents by Frans Kuyper. These two parties were reunited on the death of their leaders.

Bredenberg is known for having written a rebuttal of Spinoza in 1675. His rebuttal apparently explained Spinoza's philosophy so clearly that others accused him of disseminating Spinozism. In the end, he was dissatisfied by his own rebuttal, refuted it, and came to adopt Spinoza's ideas.
