= Kuperus (disambiguation) =

Kuperus may refer to:

== Astronomy ==
- 9692 Kuperus, an asteroid (named after Max Kuperus)

== People ==
- Harmen Kuperus (b. 1977), Frisian-Dutch footballer
- Nicola Kuperus, American musician
