= Kuijpers =

Kuijpers or Kuypers is a Dutch surname corresponding to the English Cooper. Variant spellings are Kuipers, Kuiper, and Cuypers.

Notable people with the surname Kuijpers or Kuypers include:

- Eddy Kuijpers (1914–1992), Dutch fencer
- Evy Kuijpers (born 1995), Dutch racing cyclist
- Franciscus Kuijpers (born 1941), Dutch chess player
- Hans Kuypers (1925–1988), Dutch neuroscientist
- Henk Kuijpers (born 1946), Dutch comics artist
- Jan-Hein Kuijpers (born 1968), Dutch lawyer and columnist
- Jim A. Kuypers, American communications academic
- Julien Kuypers (1892–1967), Belgian civil servant and author
- Leonard Kuypers (1899–1988), Dutch fencer
- Paul Kuijpers (1939–1971), Dutch agriculture expert
- Pierre Kuijpers (born 1945), Dutch conductor and oboist
- Pieter Kuijpers (born 1968), Dutch director, screenwriter and producer
- Rik Kuypers (1925–2019), Belgian film director
- Stephanus Kuijpers (1899–1986), bishop of Paramaribo 1958–1971
