= Go Go Tales =

- Theatrical release poster
- Directed by: Abel Ferrara
- Written by: Abel Ferrara
- Produced by: Enrico Coletti; Massimo Cortesi
- Starring: Willem Dafoe; Bob Hoskins; Asia Argento; Riccardo Scamarcio; Sylvia Miles; Stefania Rocca; Matthew Modine
- Cinematography: Fabio Cianchetti
- Edited by: Fabio Nunziata
- Music by: Francis Kuipers
- Release date: 23 May 2007
- Running time: 96 minutes
- Countries: Italy; United States
- Language: English

Go Go Tales is an independent 2007 film by Abel Ferrara. It stars Willem Dafoe as a strip club owner and co-stars Bob Hoskins, Asia Argento and Matthew Modine. Ferrara had the cast improvise much of their lines. He described the film as his "first intentional comedy".

== Plot ==
Ray Ruby, who manages Ray Ruby’s Paradise, is worried about fewer tourists visiting the establishment so he decides to hold a lottery to bring them in. Ray is running out of money but people expect to be paid, including the pole dancers. A landlady by the name of Lillian plans on using the spot for a Bed Bath & Beyond location if she does not receive rent money.

Desperate for money to keep the establishment open, Ray tries to find the winning ticket of his own lottery. His brother Johnnie helps keep the strip club open. The film shows the lives of people who depend on the strip club and what the lack of money does to them.

== Cast ==
- Willem Dafoe - Ray Ruby
- Bob Hoskins - The Baron
- Matthew Modine - Johnie Ruby
- Asia Argento - Monroe
- Riccardo Scamarcio - Doctor Steven
- Sylvia Miles - Lilian Murray
- Roy Dotrice - Jay
- Joseph Cortese - Danny Cash (as Joe Cortese)
- Burt Young - Murray
- Stefania Rocca - Debby
- Bianca Balti - Adrian
- Shanyn Leigh - Dolle
- Lou Doillon - Lola
- Frankie Cee - Luigi
- Anita Pallenberg - Sin
- Andy Luotto - Stanley
- Romina Power - Yolanda Vega
- Julie McNiven - Madison
- Dominot - Mrs. Mime
- Anton Rodgers as Barfly

== Production ==
The part of Ray Ruby was offered to Christopher Walken and Harvey Keitel.

When the film came out, Asia Argento said she regretted she did it because everyone was only talking about the infamous dog-kissing scene. But both director Abel Ferrara and actress Stefania Rocca confirmed that it was Asia herself who wanted to do that scene.

== Release ==
It was screened out of competition at the 2007 Cannes Film Festival. It has been seen only at selected film festivals, including the Montréal World Film Festival where it competed for the "Grand prix des Amériques". Despite being filmed by an American director, the film rights were never bought in the United States. Its only other United States airing besides the Cannes Film Festival and New York Film Festival was at the Anthology Film Archives, as part of a program titled "Abel Ferrara in the 21st Century". The film was released on DVD in Australia. The film was also screened in May 2019 as part of a 27-film Abel Ferrara retrospective at New York's Museum of Modern Art.

== Reception ==
On Rotten Tomatoes, the film has an approval rating of 68%, based on 19 reviews, with an average rating of 5.80/10. On Metacritic, the film has a weighted average score of 61 out of 100, based on 4 critics, indicating "generally favorable" reviews.

Ed Gonzalez, writing for Slant Magazine, praised the acting and the music. Robert Koehler, of Variety, said that "Ferrara is in a wonderfully loose and comedic mood after the complex spiritual dramatics of 'Mary.'" A review by The New York Times said, "A lovely drift of a movie, “Go Go Tales” commands your attention even as it lulls you along. Conspicuously inspired by John Cassavetes’s Killing of a Chinese Bookie among other touchstones, it is a sincere and inspired meditation on art and creation, but in a loose, funny key". Simon Miraudo, of Quickflix, said that "all anyone wanted to talk about was the sequence in which Asia Argento’s exotic dancer tongue-kissed a dog onstage". It is a Critics' Pick of The New York Times. Cahiers du Cinéma placed Go Go Tales 7th in its list of top 10 films of 2012.
