= Frans Kuyper =

Dutch Socinian writer (1629–1691)

Frans Kuyper (Latin: Franciscus Cuperus; 1629, Amsterdam – 21 October 1691, Rotterdam) was a Dutch Socinian writer and printer.

== Life ==
First a Remonstrant minister at Vlaardingen, he left the church on his objection to infant baptism. From 1663 to 1673 he opened a publishing house in Amsterdam and Rotterdam producing Socinian works, including 1665–1668 (with supplement 1692) the Biblioteca fratrum Polonorum. In 1676 he published against Spinoza's 1670 treatise on historical criticism of the Scriptures.

Kuyper played a leading part in the liberal movement of the Mennonites named the "Collegiants", through which some Socinian ideas entered Mennonitism. Kuyper was one of the most active native Dutch Socinians along with Jan Pietersz Beelthouwer (c.1603–1665), Lancelot van Brederode (c.1583–1668), Johannes Becius (1626–1690), David Willemszoon Redoch (c.1633–1680), Jan Cornelisz Knol (d.1672), Adriaan Swartepaard (1641–1691), and Foecke Floris (d.1703). In the period 1660–1664 a dispute in the Mennonite movement over the Socinian sympathies of Galenus Abrahamsz de Haan, lead to a split between "Zonist" and "Lamist" Mennonites. Socinianism briefly resurfaced in the 1740s when the Mennonite minister Johannes Stinstra (1708–1790) was suspended 1742–1757 for advocating tolerance of Socinian views.

== Works ==
- CUPERUS, Franciscus, Arcana atheismi revelata, examine Tractatus Theologico-Politici. Rotterdam. A large part of this work is dedicated to a refutation of the 4th chapter of Spinoza's Tractatus theologico-politicus of 1670

as editor:

- Danielis Breenii (Daniël van Breen) opera theologica ed. by F. Cuperus (Frans Kuyper) 1666

posthumous:

- Johann Wolfgang Jäger – Franciscus Cuperus mala fide aut ad minimum frigide atheismum Spinozae oppugnans 1710

== See also ==
- Johannes Bredenburg
- Henry More
