= Kuiper =

Kuiper is a Dutch occupational surname meaning cooper. Common spelling variants include Kuyper, Kuipers, Kuijper, Kuijpers, Kuypers, and De Kuyper. Notable people with the name include:

== Kuiper ==
- Adrian Kuiper (born 1959), South African cricketer
- Barend Klaas Kuiper (1877–1961), Dutch-American historian
- David Kuiper (born 1980), Dutch rower
- Duane Kuiper (born 1950), American retired baseball player and broadcaster
- Edith Kuiper (born 1960), Dutch economist
- F. B. J. Kuiper (1907–2003), Dutch Indologist
- Gerard Kuiper (1905–1973), Dutch-American astronomer after whom the Kuiper belt was named
- Glen Kuiper (born 1963) American broadcaster
- Hennie Kuiper (born 1949), Dutch cyclist
- J. P. Kuiper (1922–1985), Dutch professor of social medicine
- Michael Kuiper (born 1989), Dutch martial artist
- Nick Kuiper (born 1982), Canadian ice hockey player
- Nicky Kuiper (born 1989), Dutch footballer
- Nicolaas Kuiper (1920–1994), Dutch mathematician, known for Kuiper's test, Kuiper's theorem, and the Eells–Kuiper manifold
- Peter Kuiper (1929–2007), Dutch-German actor
- Piet Kuiper (1934–2017), Dutch botanist
- Rienk Kuiper (1886–1966), Frisian-Dutch president of Calvin College
- Roel Kuiper (born 1962), Dutch historian, philosopher and politician
- Taco Kuiper (1941–2004), South African publisher and journalist

== Kuyper ==
- Abraham Kuyper (1837–1920), Dutch prime minister, theologian, and founder of a Protestant church
- Elisabeth Kuyper (1877–1953), Dutch Romantic composer and conductor
- Frans Kuyper (1629–1691), Dutch Socinian writer and printer
- Jacques Kuyper (1761–1808), Dutch draftsman and composer

== See also ==
- Frans Kuiper (disambiguation)
- Kuyper College
