= Kiper =

Surname list

Kiper is a surname. Notable people with the surname include:

- Hakan Kiper, Turkish swimmer
- Herbert Kiper, German actor
- Jessica Kiper, American actress
- Mel Kiper Jr., American football analyst
- Oleh Kiper, Ukrainian politician
- Randall Kiper, American rapper whose stage name is Kyper

== See also ==
- Kipper (disambiguation)
