= John Stubbs (Quaker) =

English Quaker minister (c. 1618–1675)

John Stubbs (c.1618–1675) was an itinerant English Quaker minister and author who engaged in a well-known debate with Roger Williams in Rhode Island.

Stubbs had received a liberal education and was fluent in several languages, including Hebrew, Latin, and Greek. Stubbs served as a soldier in Cromwell's army and was stationed in the Carlisle garrison where George Fox was imprisoned in 1653 and Fox converted Stubbs to the Quaker beliefs. Stubbs refused to take an oath of fidelity to Cromwell in 1654 as against his Quaker beliefs, so he left the army that year. In Lancashire in 1660, Stubbs tried to ban vulgar expressions in the Classics from Latin instruction. Stubbs was instrumental in advocating for the use of "thee" and "thou" by the Quakers to describe a single person. According to George Fox in the 1660s, Stubbs had a wife and four children and was imprisoned by a judge for not swearing an oath according to his Quaker beliefs. Stubbs "traveled extensively in England, Scotland, Ireland, Wales and Holland." While in Amsterdam he preached to the Collegiants with fellow Quaker William Ames. He traveled to America with George Fox and stayed behind upon Fox's return. Stubbs debated the Protestant theologian Roger Williams in Rhode Island (New England) in 1672 with several other Quakers. The debate was published in Williams' George Fox Digged out of his Burrowes. Stubbs wrote several Quaker books.
