= Elizabeth Kuipers =

Professor Elizabeth Kuipers OBE
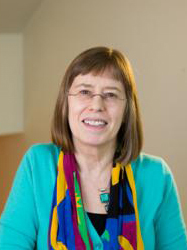
- Elizabeth Kuipers
- Employer: Institute of Psychiatry King's College London

Elizabeth Alice Kuipers OBE FAcSS is a professor of psychology at the Institute of Psychiatry, King's College London, and was head of the Psychology Department from 2006- 2012. Kuipers is a consultant clinical psychologist and until 2012, had an honorary appointment at the South London and Maudsley NHS Foundation Trust, working as part of the psychosis community mental health team in Southwark. She is a founding director of the PICuP clinic (Psychological Interventions Clinic for outpatients with Psychosis) and was the chair of the NICE Schizophrenia Guideline update 2007-9 and the Psychosis and Schizophrenia update 2011-2014

In 2010 she was given the Shapiro award from the British Psychological Society for clinical psychology and became an Academician of the Social Sciences in 2009. In 2013 she received a lifetime achievement award from Women in Science and Engineering (WISE). In 2014 she received a lifetime achievement award from the Professional Practice Board of the British Psychological Society (BPsS).

== Selected publications ==
- Kuipers E., Yesufu-Udechuku A., Taylor C. and Kendall T. (In press). Management of Psychosis and Schizophrenia in adults: summary of NICE guidance. British Medical Journal.
- Marwaha S., Broome MR., Bebbington P. and Kuipers E. (2013) Mood instability and psychosis: analyses of British National Survey data. Schizophrenia Bulletin 2013 Oct 25 [Epub ahead of print] PMID 24162517
- Garety, Philippa A., Daniel Freeman, Suzanne Jolley, Graham Dunn, Paul E. Bebbington, David G. Fowler, Elizabeth Kuipers, and Robert Dudley. "Reasoning, emotions, and delusional conviction in psychosis." Journal of abnormal psychology 114, no. 3 (2005): 373. doi:10.1037/0021-843X.114.3.373
- Freeman, Daniel, Philippa A. Garety, Elizabeth Kuipers, David Fowler, and Paul E. Bebbington. "A cognitive model of persecutory delusions." British Journal of Clinical Psychology 41, no. 4 (2002): 331–347. doi:10.1348/014466502760387461
- Johns, Louise C., James Y. Nazroo, Paul Bebbington, and Elizabeth Kuipers. "Occurrence of hallucinatory experiences in a community sample and ethnic variations." The British Journal of Psychiatry 180, no. 2 (2002): 174–178. doi:10.1192/bjp.180.2.174
