= George Fox Digged out of his Burrowes =

1676 religious book by Roger Williams

George Fox Digged out of his Burrowes (George Fox Digg'd out of his Burrowes or an offer of Disputation on fourteen Proposals made this last Summer of 1672 unto G. Fox then present on Rode-Island in New England) is a book written by Rhode Island founder and Reformed Baptist theologian Roger Williams in 1676. The book discusses the debate regarding traditional Protestant Christianity and Quakerism with its different belief in the "inner light," which Williams considered heretical.

== Background ==
In 1672, Roger Williams (at age 68) rowed alone, all night, from Providence, Rhode Island to Newport, Rhode Island to debate prominent Quakers William Edmondson, John Stubbs (c.1618–1675), and John Burnyeat at nine the next morning. Williams initially wanted to debate the famous English Quaker George Fox, but Fox left Rhode Island without answering Williams' letter inviting him to a debate. In response to Williams' request, the Quakers agreed to debate him for three days in Newport and one day in Providence. Williams' account of the debates was printed in Boston by John Foster in 1676.
