= Een Bloemhof =

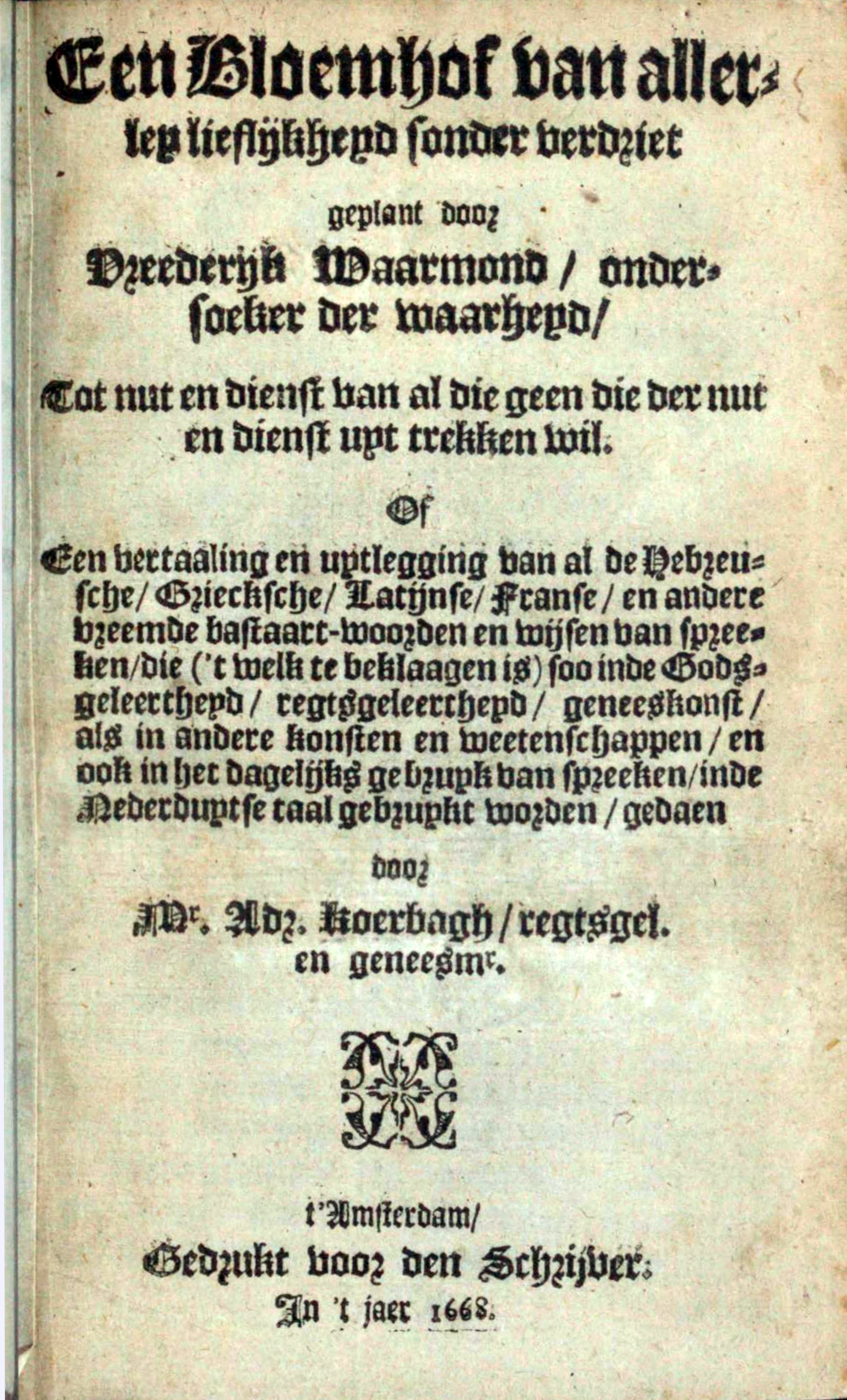
- Author: Vreederijk Waarmond (Adriaan Koerbagh)
- Original title: Een Bloemhof van allerley lieflykheyd sonder verdriet geplant door Vreederyk Waarmond, ondersoeker der waarheyd, tot nut en dienst van al die geen der nut en dienst uyt trekken wil : of een vertaaling en uytlegging van al de Hebreusche, Grieksche, Latijnse, Franse, en andere vreemde bastaart-woorden en wijsen van spreeken, die ('t welk te beklaagen is) so inde Godsgeleertheyd, regtsgeleertheyd, geneeskonst, als in andere konsten en weetenschappen, en ook in het dagelijks gebruyk van spreeken, inde Nederduytse taal gebruykt worden, gedaen door Adr. Koerbagh
- Language: Dutch
- Genre: Dictionary
- Published: Amsterdam
- Publisher: The author
- Publication date: 1668
- Publication place: Dutch Republic

Een Bloemhof [əm ˈblumɦɔf] is a dictionary published in 1668 and written by Adriaan Koerbagh under his own name (the ‘pseudonym’ Vreederijk Waarmond being part of the book’s subtitle). Its full title was Een Bloemhof van allerley Lieflijkheyd sonder verdriet (A Flower Garden of All Kinds of Loveliness without Sorrow). The book sparked controversy in Amsterdam (where it was published) because of its articles defining political and religious terms, even though they comprise only a small portion of the overall dictionary. The book also offers laymen explanations for technical jargon and foreign terms, covering topics such as medicine and law.

== Enlightenment ideas and censorship ==
The dictionary espoused ideas associated with the radical Enlightenment and was condemned as heretical by Dutch Reformed Church authorities. In Een Bloemhof, Koerbagh criticizes the Christian concept of Trinity and questions the divinity of Jesus. The dictionary's entry on Jesus claims that Jesus Christ was a mortal man who had an unnamed father.

The entry on heretics and heresy lambastes the clergy for exploiting the idea of heresy to manipulate secular rulers into handing over their power to the Church. Koerbagh rejected stories of supernatural phenomena as myths meant to fool the ignorant, believing "nothing can happen against or above Nature." He was skeptical of the existence of miracles, angels, demons, and magic.

== Influence of Baruch Spinoza ==
The dictionary's theological comments were influenced by the ideas of Spinoza.

== Persecution and self-exile of the writer ==
The Bloemhof was suppressed in Amsterdam on the grounds that it contained "blasphemous remarks about God, our Savior Jesus Christ, the Son of God, and the divine and perfect Word of the Lord." There was public outcry against the book. The Amsterdam consistory investigated Koerbagh and his brother for their allegedly heretical activities. The publication of the dictionary violated a 1653 law in Holland prohibiting the promulgation of Socinian and any other antitrinitarian views. Copies of Een Bloemhof were confiscated in Amsterdam. The chief police officer of Amsterdam ordered Koerbagh to remain in the city, but Koerbagh managed to escape to Culemborg where he hid using the alias Pieter Wilte.

Koerbagh brought with him an unfinished manuscript for Een Ligt, schynende in duystere plaatsen (A Light Shining in Dark Places). Koerbagh had been working on Een Ligt since completing Een Bloemhof in 1667. The printing of Een Ligt began in Utrecht, but stopped when the printer became concerned about the opinions expressed in the book. The printer notified the sheriff of Utrecht, who contacted the sheriff of Amsterdam. Koerbagh fled Culemborg after being alerted of his impending arrest, but was apprehended in Leiden and brought back to Amsterdam.

The authorities ordered the burning of every known copy of Een Bloemhof and Een Ligt. Koerbagh's sentence was a decade of imprisonment, a four thousand guilder fine, and a decade of banishment from Amsterdam following his release from jail.
