= Jan Pietersz Beelthouwer =

Dutch controversialist (c. 1603– c. 1665)

Jan Pieterszoon Beelthouwer (c. 1603 – c. 1665) was a Dutch Collegiant controversialist of unorthodox beliefs from Enkhuizen. He propagated Socinian views.

From around 1644 he had public debates with Isaac Montalto, Jacob Judah Leon and Menasseh ben Israel, Sephardic Jews of Amsterdam. He was regarded as a heretic in Enkhuizen from 1656. He wrote against the conservative Mennonite apothecary Lambert Bidloo.
