= Oscar Kuipers =

Dutch molecular geneticist

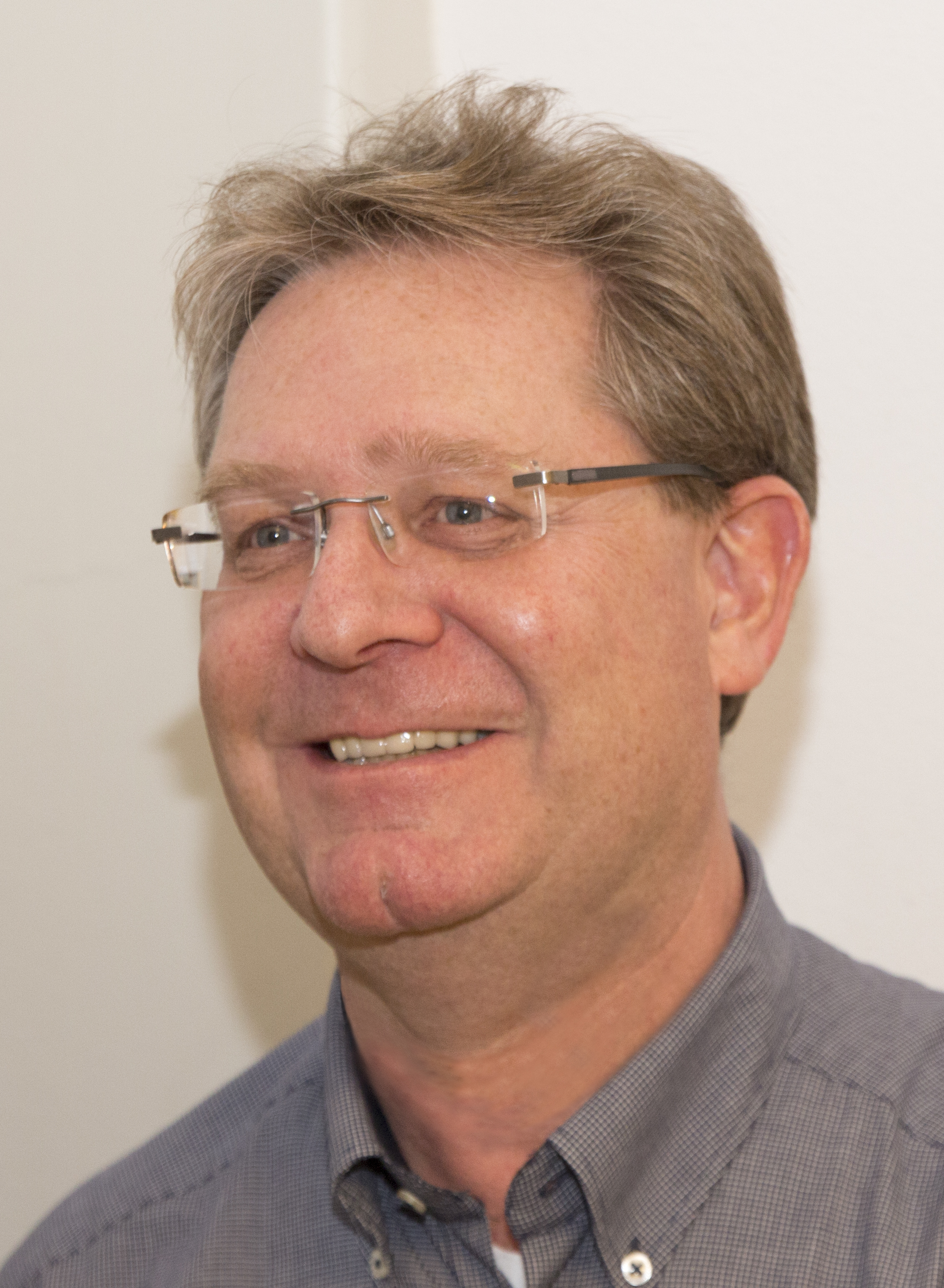
- Born: 12 May 1956 (age 70); Rotterdam, the Netherlands
- Education: Utrecht University
- Scientific career
- Fields: Molecular genetics Microbiology; Biotechnology
- Workplaces: University of Groningen, 1984-present Royal Dutch Shell, 1979-1984
- Thesis: Probing the mechanism of pancreatic phospholipase A2 by protein engineering (1990)
- Doctoral advisor: Prof. Dr. G.H. de Haas; Prof. Dr. H.M. Verheij
- Website: Staff page

Oscar Paul Kuipers (Rotterdam, May 12, 1956) is a Dutch professor of molecular genetics at the University of Groningen. His areas of expertise include microbiology, biochemistry, molecular and cell biology, and biotechnology.

== Study and career ==
- Kuipers graduated in 1986 in biology at Utrecht University.
- In 1988 Kuipers obtained an EMBO Fellowship for three month at the lab of Dr. J. Gallay of the University of Paris-Sud in Orsay (Paris) to study time-resolved Fluorescence.
- In 1989 Kuipers received a SHELL fellowship to give lectures in the United States at Prof. Mahendra Jain (Newark), Prof. Michael Gelb (Seattle) and Prof. Yang (San Francisco) and on a conference about Time Resolved Fluorescence.
- In 1990 Kuipers obtained his doctorate at the University of Utrecht in biochemistry with the thesis Probing the mechanism of pancreatic phospholipase A2 by protein engineering.
- From 1990 to 1997 he worked as a project leader on molecular genetics at the Department of Biophysical Chemistry of NIZO food research, a contract research center in Ede (The Netherlands).
- From 1997 to 1999 he was head of genetics and research leader of the section Microbial Ingredients of the same institute.
- From 1999 Kuipers is professor and head of the ‘Molecular Genetics of Prokaryotes’ group of the Groningen Biomolecular Sciences and Biotechnology Institute (GBB) of the University of Groningen.

== Honours and awards ==
- 2015 elected board member, European Academy of Microbiology (EAM)
- 2013 elected member, European Academy of Microbiology (EAM)
- 2012 iGEM Team Groningen: European and World Champion 2012 (Kuipers was supervisor/coach/coordinator of the iGEM team Groningen from 2008-2015)
- 2011 elected member, Royal Netherlands Academy of Arts and Sciences (KNAW)
- 2011 Simon Stevin Meester Award (Science and Technology Award of STW, NWO, the Netherlands) €500,000

== Administrative and management functions ==
- 1999 – 2000 member of the founding committee of the Groningen Genomics Centre of the University of Groningen
- 1999 – 2007 member of the board of directors of the Groningen Biomolecular Sciences and Biotechnology Institute (GBB) of the University of Groningen
- 2000 – 2007 chairman of the Genetics Cluster of the University of Groningen
- 2011 – present member of the scientific advisory board of the LOEWE Institute for Synthetitic Microbiology (Synmikro) in Marburg (Germany)
- 2013 – present confidential advisor on scientific integrity, Faculty of Mathematics- and Natural Sciences, University of Groningen Groningen
- 2015 – present chairman and co-founder of the Centre for Sustainable Antimicrobials (CeSAM) of the University of Groningen
- 2015 – present cofounder, Centre for Antimicrobial Research (CARES). Chairman & Director: Prof. Gilles van Wezel.

== Research ==
The research of Kuipers and his research group is focused on curiosity driven research with a keen eye on biotechnological applications. Kuipers has so far supervised 21 postdoctoral researchers and 35 PhD students in their doctorate research. At the moment (October 2015) he supervises 18 PhD students and 7 postdoctoral researchers. He has been invited more than 180 times to national and international conferences, seminars and congresses to give a lecture.

An important topic of research is the study of the genetics and physiology of bacteria. Among others, the cellular differentiation of bacteria is investigated. Bacteria growing in a culture can develop different characteristics, while their genome remains unchanged. Kuipers stated: ‘Our research has many applications, for example the improvement of protein production in industrial fermentation'. Another important subject is the production and modification of peptides. These modified peptides (called lantibiotics), are made by bacteria, and can serve as antibiotic. Modified peptides are chemically more stable and retain their function longer than unmodified peptides. This is beneficial for medical applications as a novel class of antibiotics. Further areas of focus are the molecular biology of: competence, sporulation and bistability in Bacillus subtilis, the reconstruction of gene networks, antimicrobial peptides, antibiotics, mechanisms of pathogenesis, cell wall anchoring, controlled gene expression systems, the subcellular localization of protein, stress response, quorum sensing, regulation of the C- and N-metabolism, natural gene transfer methodologies, plant-biocontrol by Bacilli and Biotechnology applications.

=== Research for industry ===
- 2014 – 2017 Corbion, Corbion Thermophiles. Prime investigator €530k
- 2010-2013 Purac, Competence in industrial Bacillus strains. Prime investigator €420k
- 2004 – 2007 DSM Bakery Ingredients B.V. Sense: Screening for protein secretion using secretion stress indicators. Prime investigator €640k
- 2001 – 2005 Frico + DSM Directing Starters Together 2 (several partners). Prime investigator €554k
- 2000 – 2006 Intervet International B.V. Expression of heterologous proteins in Bacillus. Prime investigator €433k

=== Research by bachelor and master students ===
From 2008 Kuipers is supervisor, coach and coordinator of the iGEM student team Groningen. iGEM is a worldwide competition in the field of synthetic biology between teams of students from all over the world. The team from Groningen won in the annual in Boston (United States) organized international competition several gold medals (2008 to 2016). In 2012, when the team from Groningen became world champion, the research concerned a study of an alternative method to determine whether food is spoiled: the Food warden . This method makes use of genetic engineered bacteria responsive to the volatiles of the decomposing meat. A pigment makes the decomposition visible.

== Publications ==
Prof. dr. O.P. Kuipers published 365 articles in scientific papers, 2 books and 18 chapters in books. 34 publications appeared in 2015. Kuipers articles have been cited over 26 148 times and he has a H-index of 84 and an i10 index of 278. This means that 80 of his articles have been cited at least 80 times and that 278 articles have been cited more than 10 times.

- An overview of the most significant publications of Oscar Kuipers.
