= Kipper (disambiguation) =

A kipper is a salted and smoked fish.

Kipper or Kippers may refer to:

== Arts and entertainment ==
- Kipper the Dog, the title character of a children's book series by Mick Inkpen
  - Kipper (TV series), an animated children's TV series
- Kipper Robinson, a character in The Magic Key children's book series
- Kipper Herring, a fictional character in a Jeeves novel
- Kipper, a comic character in the cartoon strip Penelope and Kipper
- Brave Captain Kipper, a character in the Beano comic strip of the same name (1938–1939)
- The Kipper Kids, also known as Harry and Harry Kipper, a 1970s performing artist duo
- Kipper, a fictional rock band from the film Confessions of a Pop Performer

== People ==
- Aksel Kipper (1907–1984), Estonian astrophysicist and academician
- Bob Kipper (born 1964), American baseball coach and former Major League Baseball relief pitcher
- Irvin Kipper (1916–2016), American Air Force pilot and founder of Kip's Toyland
- Josefin Kipper (1928–1981), Austrian actress
- Thornton Kipper (1928–2006), American Major League Baseball pitcher
- K. M. Cariappa (1898–1993), Commander-in-Chief of the Indian Army nicknamed "Kipper"
- Miikka Kiprusoff, Finnish hockey player nicknamed "Kipper"
- Christopher Kipper Williams (born 1954), British cartoonist
- Kipper (musician), born Mark Eldridge
- The Kipper Family, a parody English folk duo of Sid and Henry Kipper
- "Mr Kipper", an unknown person of interest in the disappearance of Suzy Lamplugh

== Other uses ==
- Kipper (medieval tournament), a person employed by a knight in medieval tournaments
- Kipper (politics), a supporter of the UK Independence Party
- Kipper tie, an unusually wide necktie
- AS-2 Kipper, NATO reporting name of the Raduga K-10S Soviet cruise missile
- Kipper (supermarket), a North Macedonian chain of discount supermarkets

== See also ==
- Gipper (disambiguation)
- Kiper, a list of people with the surname
- Kippah, a cap worn by Jewish males
- "Kipper und Wipper", a 17th-century European financial crisis
- Yom Kippur, the holiest day of the year in Judaism
