= Cuypers =

Cuypers is a variation of the Dutch surname Kuipers and, has the same meaning as the English surname Cooper or Coopers. People with this surname include:

- Alain Cuypers (born 1967), Belgian hurdler
- Brigitte Cuypers (born 1955), South African tennis player.
- Eduard Cuypers (1859–1927), Dutch architect, nephew of Pierre Cuypers
- Elisabeth Cuypers, Belgian chess master
- Harald Cuypers (born ca. 1940), German slalom canoeist
- Hugo Cuypers (born 1997), Belgian footballer
- Joseph Cuypers (1861–1949), Dutch architect, son of Pierre Cuypers
- Julia Cuypers (1871–1952), Belgian-Dutch stage and film actress
- Leo Cuypers (1947–2017), Dutch jazz composer and pianist
- Modeste Cuypers (1883–1944), Belgian fencer
- Pierre Cuypers (1827–1921), Dutch architect, father of Jos Cuypers
