= Quip (company) =

Brooklyn-based oral hygiene company

quip
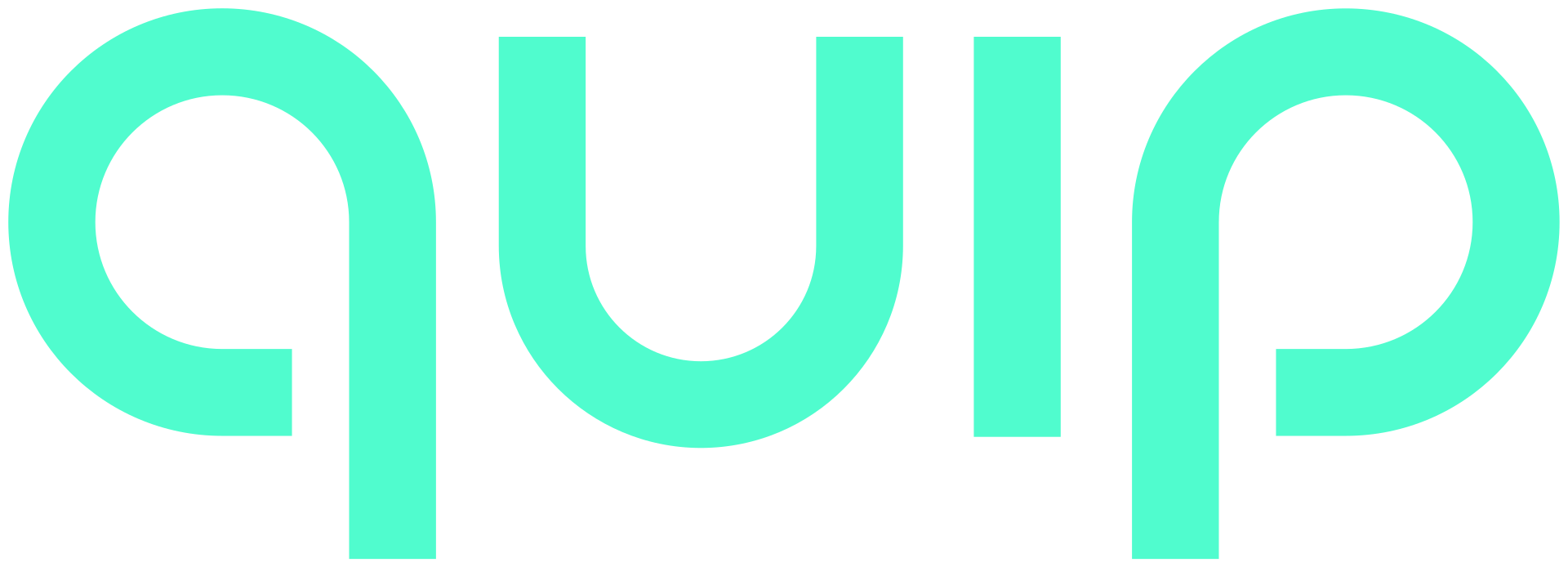
- Industry: Oral hygiene
- Founded: February 2015
- Founders: Simon Enever, Bill May
- Headquarters: Brooklyn, New York, U.S.
- Website: getquip.com

Quip (stylized in lowercase) is an American oral hygiene company that sells electric toothbrushes and other oral hygiene products. It is based in Brooklyn, New York.

== History ==
Quip was founded in February 2015 by Simon Enever and Bill May and officially launched that November. In November 2017, it raised $10 million in series A venture capital funding from prominent investors such as Demi Lovato and Sherpa Capital. A subsequent round of funding brought the company a further $40 million from Sherpa Capital in November 2018. This funding was announced shortly after quip began selling their toothbrushes in Target stores rather than only through an online subscription. By January 2019, the company had sold over 1 million toothbrushes and gained over 1 million subscribers.
