= Kuipers =

Kuipers is a Dutch occupational surname meaning cooper's. Common spelling variants include Kuiper, Kuijpers, and Kuypers. Notable people with the surname include:

- Aert H. Kuipers (1919–2012), Dutch linguist
- Alice Kuipers (born 1979), British-Canadian author
- André Kuipers (born 1958), Dutch astronaut
- Bas Kuipers (born 1994), Dutch footballer
- Benjamin Kuipers (born 1949) American computer scientist
- Benno Kuipers (born 1974), Dutch breaststroke swimmer
- Björn Kuipers (born 1973), Dutch football referee
- Dennis Kuipers (born 1985), Dutch rally driver
- Elizabeth Kuipers (born ca. 1950), British psychologist
- Ellen Kuipers (born 1971), Dutch field hockey player
- Francis Kuipers (born 1941), British composer, guitarist and ethno-musicologist
- Frits Kuipers (1899–1943), Dutch footballer
- Gerry Kuipers (1935–2013), Dutch businessman and auto restorer
- Giselinde Kuipers (born 1971), Dutch sociologist
- Harm Kuipers (born 1947), Dutch speed skater
- Helena Kuipers-Rietberg (1893–1944), Dutch resistance organiser in WWII
- Karin Kuipers (born 1972), Dutch waterpolo player
- Michel Kuipers (born 1974), Dutch footballer
- Nick Kuipers (footballer born 1992), Dutch footballer for MVV Maastricht
- Oedo Kuipers (born 1989), Dutch musical theater performer
- Oscar Kuipers (born 1956), Dutch molecular geneticist
- René Kuipers (born 1960), Dutch rally driver
- Ronald A. Kuipers (born 1969), Canadian philosopher
- Simon Kuipers (born 1982), Dutch speed skater

== See also ==
- Mount Kuipers, a mountain in Antarctica
