= Watse Cuperus =

Frisian writer (1891–1966)

- Born: 30 April 1891; Blije (Netherlands)
- Died: 25 August 1966 (aged 75); Leeuwarden (Netherlands)
- Occupations: writer and translator
- Writing career
- Language: West Frisian
- Period: 20th century
- Genres: short stories, drama
- Notable works: De gouden tried (The golden wire)

Watse Cuperus (1891 – 1966) was a Dutch journalist, writer and translator. He wrote in West Frisian, and his most important work is The golden wire (De gouden tried, 1941–50).

== Books ==
- 1933 : Skeanebûrster folkslibben
- 1937 : Lânstoarm XI
- 1941–50 : De gouden tried (1941, 1942 e 1950)
- 1943 : Oarreheite erfskip
- 1946 : Sa't lân opjowt
- 1947 : De pipegael (réimpression 1969)
- 1948 : Doeke Daen
- 1949 : Swart, mar leaflik (réimpression 1969, deuxième réimpression 1998)
- 1955 : Hoeder en skiep
- 1958 : Striid en segen (romance autobiographic)
- 1964 : De sierlike kroan
- 1966 : Jild en eare

== Books for children ==
- 1936 : Oarreheite pet (reprinted 1941; 2nd reprinted 1948)

== Drama ==
- 1955 : Do silst net stelle, 4 acts
- 1956 : Libbensropping, 4 acts
- 1966 : The golden wire (De gouden tried), 4 acts

== Translations ==
- 1959: Dark but beautiful (Zwart maar lieflijk, from West Frisian Swart mar leaflik)
