= Philippa Garety =

British psychologist

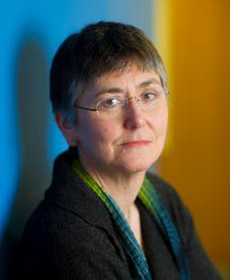
King's College portrait, 2013

Philippa Garety is Professor of Clinical Psychology and Clinical Director of the Psychosis Clinical Academic Group (CAG), South London and Maudsley NHS Foundation Trust. Garety specializes in the psychological understanding and treatment of psychosis and, in particular, delusions.

Garety is a Fellow of the British Psychological Society and received the Shapiro award in 2002. In 2008 Garety was selected as a Senior Investigator of the National Institute for Health Research (NIHR).

== Academic career ==
Garety began her career by completing a B.A. in Natural Sciences (Psychology) University of Cambridge in 1979. She then undertook an M.Phil in Clinical Psychology at the Institute of Psychiatry, London University, which she completed in 1981. Garety was awarded her PhD in Psychology from London University in 1990. She later went on to receive an M.A. in Education (Higher and Professional) from the Institute of Education, London University in 1996.

== Employment ==
Garety was the Professor of Clinical Psychology/Trust Head of Psychology King’s College London/South London and Maudsley NHS Foundation Trust (1997-2010).

She is currently the Clinical Director and Joint Leader, Psychosis CAG, South London & Trust Head of Psychology South London and Maudsley NHS Foundation Trust, and an Honorary Consultant Clinical Psychologist. She also holds the position of Professor of Clinical Psychology at the Institute of Psychiatry, Psychology and Neuroscience, King's College, London.

== Selected publications ==
- Garety, P.A., and Freeman, D. “The past and future of delusions research: from the inexplicable to the treatable.” British Journal of Psychiatry (2013): 203,327-333
- Garety, P.A., Kuipers, E., Fowler, D., Freeman, D., and Bebbington, P. E. “A cognitive model of the positive symptoms of psychosis.” Psychological Medicine (2001): 31,189-195
- Fowler, D, Garety, P., and Kuipers, E. "Cognitive behaviour therapy for psychosis: Theory and practice". Vol. 68. Chichester: Wiley, 1995. ISBN 0471939803
- Garety, P A., and Freeman, D . "Cognitive approaches to delusions: A critical review of theories and evidence." British journal of clinical psychology 38, no. 2 (1999): 113-154.
- Garety, P, Ward, T, Emsley, R, Greenwood, K., Freeman, D., Fowler, D., Kuipers, E., Bebbington, P., Rus-Calafell, M., McGourty, A., Sacadura, C. (2021). "Effects of SlowMo, a Blended Digital Therapy Targeting Reasoning, on Paranoia Among People With Psychosis: A Randomized Clinical Trial". JAMA Psychiatry. 78 (7): 714. doi:10.1001/jamapsychiatry.2021.0326.
