= John Burnyeat =

British Quaker (c. 1631 – 1690)

John Burnyeat (also spelled Burneyeat) (ca. 1631 in Crabtreebeck, Loweswater, Cumberland – 11 July 1690 in Kilconnor, County Carlow, Ireland) was a British Quaker.

== Biography ==
A Cumberland farmer, he joined the Quakers in 1653. He began to interrupt church services and was imprisoned in Scotland in 1658 after he made an unsuccessful attempt to plant quakerism there. After spending a few months on his farm upon release, he made a similar effort in Ireland, where he was imprisoned several times for short periods, and was more than once nearly starved to death in crossing what were then almost uninhabited parts of the island. Burneyeat was a born missionary, and in 1660 felt 'moved' to visit America. For nearly two years he resisted the impulse, until, its strength increasing, he sought out George Fox and consulted him on the matter. Shortly afterwards he was again arrested and sent to prison for refusing to take the sacrament, and was treated with considerable harshness. According to his own account he was released at the end of fourteen weeks, because 'there was a bowling-alley before the prison door, where several of the magistrates and others used to come to their games; and hearing my voice they were offended and sent me away.'

He then went on a tour of Barbados, Virginia and New England, from 1664 to 1667. He was imprisoned again in 1668–70 in London. He then returned to America. In Rhode Island in 1672, Burneyeat with several other Quakers took part in a dispute with Roger Williams, which was published in Williams' George Fox Digged out of his Burrowes in 1676. Burnyeat then went to Ireland in 1673, where he lived for the rest of his life. He was imprisoned in Dublin in 1676 but released in 1683 and was soon married (for five years until the death of his wife in 1688). In the same year he married Elizabeth Maine and they were married for five years until her death. Afterwards he avoided trouble with the law and published pamphlets.

He died in Kilconner, County Carlow, on 11 July 1690, aged about 59, and was buried at the New Garden burial-ground, near Dublin, having been a quaker minister for twenty-three years. He left one son, Jonathan, who became a quaker minister at the age of twelve. Jonathan died in Cumberland in 1709. Unlike so many of the early Friends, Burneyeat was not a voluminous writer; but though his scholarship was small and his literary style poor, his works were much esteemed during the early part of the eighteenth century, owing to their earnest spirit of piety.

His collected works were published in 1691 under the title of The Truth exalted in the Writings of that Eminent and Faithful Servant of Christ, John Burneyeat, &c., with Prefaces to the Reader and several testimonies from various Friends in England, Ireland, and America. No biographical book of Burneyeat has ever been published, and the scanty remnants of his history can only be gleaned from the testimonies of his friends and occasional references in the works of himself and his contemporaries.

== Publications ==
His publications include;

- A New England fire-brand quenched (1678)
- An epistle from John Burneyeat to Friends in Pennsylvania (1686)
- The holy truth and its professions defended (1688) (with John Watson)
- The innocency of the Christian quakers manifested (1688) (with Amos Strettell)
- The Journal and Letters of John Burnyeat
- The truth exalted in the writings of that eminent and faithful servant of Christ, John Burnyeat, collected into this ensuing volume as a memorial to his faithful labours ...
