= Wiep van Bunge =

Dutch historian of philosophy

Louis (Wiep) van Bunge (born 1960) is a Dutch historian of philosophy. He has published mainly on the early Enlightenment in the Netherlands, on Spinoza and on his influence on other thinkers.

== Life ==
Van Bunge was born at The Hague on 22 May 1960. He graduated B.A. and M.A. in philosophy at Utrecht University. He obtained his doctorate at Erasmus University in Rotterdam with a dissertation on Johannes Bredenburg.

From 2004 to 2012 van Bunge was Dean of the Faculty of Philosophy at Erasmus University, where he has been a professor since 2000. He is a member of the Royal Netherlands Academy of Arts and Sciences (2014), and of the Koninklijke Hollandsche Maatschappij der Wetenschappen. Director of a research project of the Netherlands Organisation for Scientific Research on the Dutch early enlightenment in the period 2000-2005, he was co-director of another affiliated project on the same subject in the period 2010-2014. He has been co-editor of publications on and around Spinoza, and is a former editor of the journal Geschiedenis van de wijsbegeerte in Nederland.

== Works ==
- Johannes Bredenburg (1643-1691). Een Rotterdamse collegiant in de ban van Spinoza. Rotterdam, 1990
- Spinoza en zijn critici over de autonomie van het attribuut. Delft, 1995.
- Baruch of Benedictus? Spinoza en de 'Marranen'. Delft, 2001 (inaugural lecture 2 March 2001).
- From Stevin to Spinoza. An essay on philosophy in the seventeenth-century Dutch Republic. Leiden, 2001.
- Filosoof van vrede. De Haagse Spinoza. Den Haag, 2008.
- De Nederlandse Republiek, Spinoza en de radicale verlichting. Antwerp, 2010.
- Spinoza past and present. Essays on Spinoza, Spinozism, and Spinoza scholarship. Leiden, 2012.

== Background ==
Van Bunge was born into the Van Bunge family of Dutch nobility, and has the title Jonkheer. He is the son of Lodewijk Frederik Wilhelmus Maria van Bunge (1926–2009), journalist, and his second wife Ellie Lenie Emma Uitenbroek (born 1938), also a journalist.
