= Kipper (medieval tournament) =

In medieval tournaments, a kipper was a person employed by a knight, usually a vassal of the knight such as a slave, serf, or peasant. Kippers might also be fighters of non-knightly status, who therefore did not fight on horseback.

The function of the kipper was to follow his knight in combat and retrieve armour or arms from fallen adversaries. If the adversary was not completely subdued and ready to surrender these, the kipper would bang on the armour-clad opponent with various blunt non-lethal instruments, like heavy sticks or clubs, to knock him unconscious for the purpose of gathering the spoils without further protest.

It was the right of a knight to seize the armour and weapons of a fallen adversary during a tournament. In the early days, tournament fighting was not much different from open warfare, with few rules and none of the pomp and ceremony of the later tournaments. In this chaotic mêlée, kippers were therefore mere foot soldiers of the tournament, and it was not their function or intention to participate in the fighting.

In the later Middle Ages, when tournaments no longer resembled actual warfare and the chivalric code became more popular, kippers were frowned upon. Less warlike and more honorable tournament conduct was encouraged.

The word kipper is cognate with Icelandic kippa ("to pull, snatch"), Danish kippen ("to seize"), and a Middle High German word that means "to beat or kick".

== See also ==
- Pas d'Armes
- Jousting
