= Benjamin Furly =

English Quaker merchant and pampleteer

Benjamin Furly (13 April 1636 – March 1714) was an English Quaker merchant and friend of John Locke.

== Life ==
Furly was born at Colchester on 13 April 1636. He began life as a merchant there, and joined the Quakers quite early in their existence. In 1659–60 he assisted John Stubbs in the compilation of the 'Battle-Door.' George Fox records that this work was finished in 1661, and that Furly took great pains with it.

In 1677 Furly was exiled from England, and took up residence in Rotterdam, setting up as a merchant in the Scheepmaker's Haven. There, Furly is credited for attracting international attention to the Quakers among people of learning. His home was a place of refuge for exiles from England and France; Fox came to stay in 1677 and held religious meetings at Furly's house in Rotterdam, and Furly then accompanied Fox, Keith, and others through Holland and Germany, acting as an interpreter.

Later on in the same year he made a ministerial journey with William Penn, to find emigrants for Penn's colony. His house became the rendezvous of Jean Leclerc, Philip van Limborch, Amesius, and many other scholars. There he welcomed Algernon Sydney, Locke (who lived there from 1684 to 1688), and Locke's pupil, Anthony Ashley Cooper, 3rd Earl of Shaftesbury (1688–89). Sydney wrote to him often from 1677 to 1679. Edward Clarke of Chipley seems to have introduced Locke to him, and their correspondence lasted as long as Locke lived. Locke was known as a defender of the Quakers, likely in part through Furly's influence. When he came to visit he delighted in playing with Furly's children. Leibniz was also known to have frequented Furly's home.

Pamphlets written and translated by Furly spread awareness of Quakerism throughout the continent, provoking the opprobrium of religious thinkers from Bossuet to Jurieu, but finding acceptance in other quarters.

Furly was prominent enough among the Quakers for a contemporary work to sensationalistically declare that "If it had not been for the tragic affair of the Enthusiasts of Munster, Penn would already be King in London, Barclay in Edinburg and Furly in Rotterdam."

Subsequently, Furly renounced Quakerism, then again embraced it, but is supposed finally to have left it. He died at Rotterdam in March 1714.

== Works ==
Furly's works include:

- 'A Battle-Door for Teachers and Professors to learn Singular and Plural,' &c. (in thirty-five languages), with Stubbs and Fox, 1660.
- Preface to Ames's 'Die Sache Christi und seines Volks,' 1662.
- 'The World's Honour detected, and, for the Unprofitableness thereof, rejected,' &c., 1663.

He also wrote a number of prefaces to the works of other men, assisted George Keith in writing 'The Universal Free Grace of the Gospel asserted,' and translated several works into English from the Dutch.

Furly's library was sold by auction, and a catalogue, 'Bibliotheca Furleiana,' was published (1714).

== Family ==
He was twice married. On the death of his first wife in 1691, Locke sent a letter of condolence. By her he had four sons, Benjamin, Benjohan (b. 1681), John, and Arent. The two eldest were merchants. The youngest was secretary to the Earl of Peterborough in Spain, and died there in 1705. Benjohan's daughter, Dorothy, married Thomas Forster, whose sons were Benjamin Forster and Edward Forster. Edward's grandson, Thomas Ignatius Maria Forster, inherited much of Furly's correspondence, and printed part of his collection as 'Original Letters of Locke, Shaftesbury, and Sydney' in 1830, reissuing it in his privately printed 'Epistolarium' in 1830, 2nd edit. 1847. Much of Shaftesbury's correspondence with Furly went to the Public Record Office.
