= Lodewijk Meyer =

Dutch physician and scholar

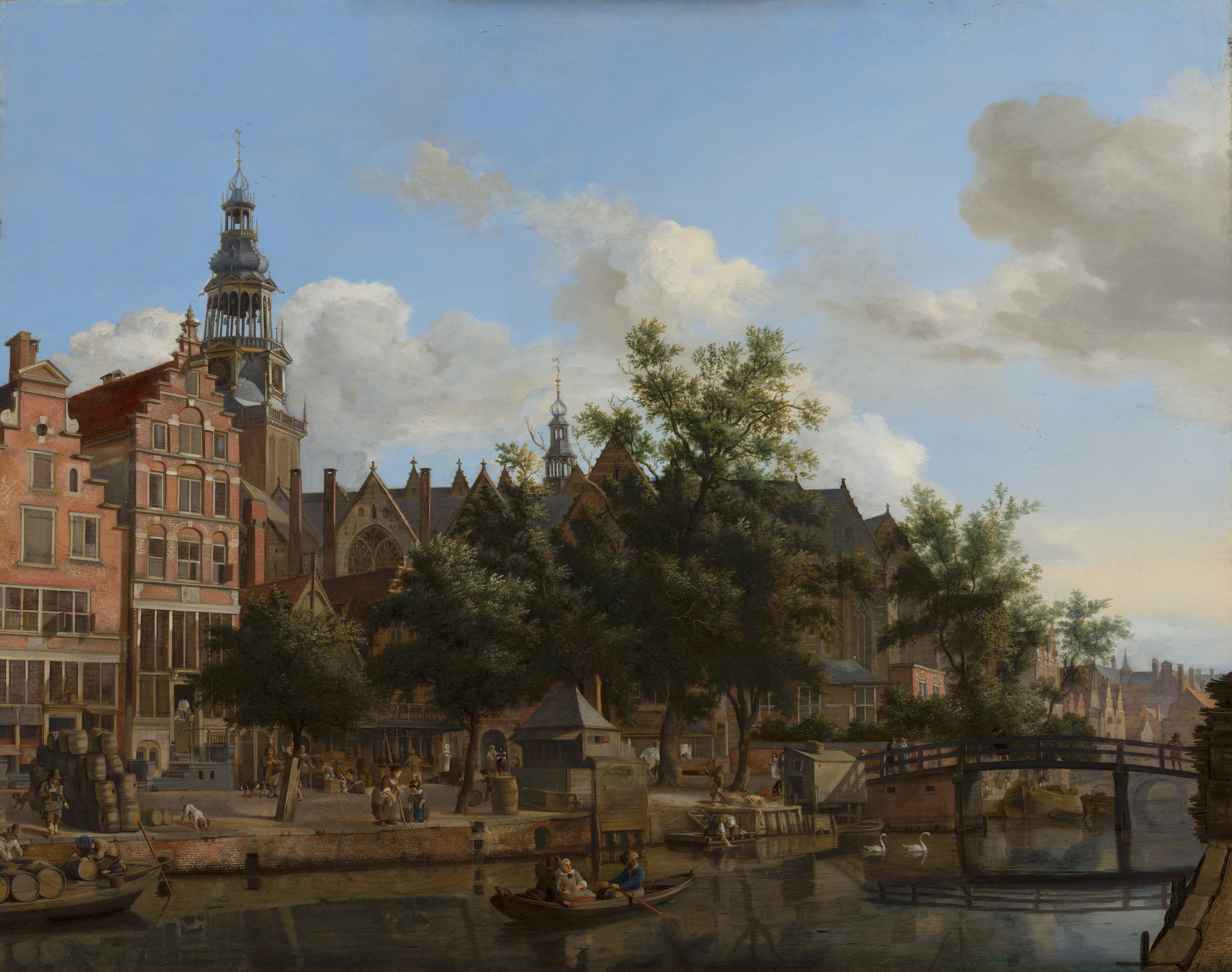
Jan van der Heyden: View of Oudezijds Voorburgwal with the Oude Kerk in Amsterdam, 1670. Bierkaai (beer quay) where Meyer was born in 1629

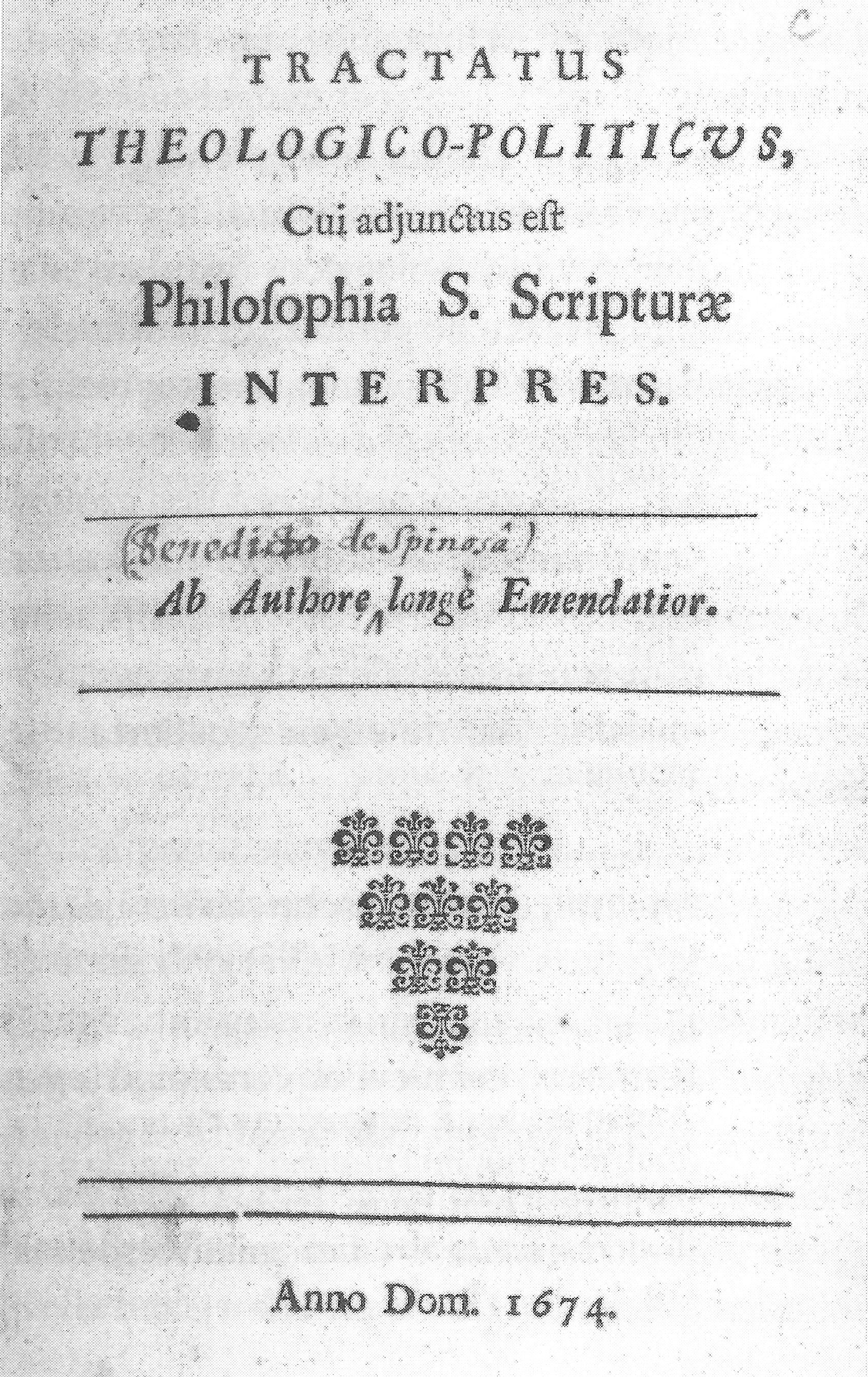
(Anonymous, Lodewijk Meijer): Philosophia S. Scripturae interpres, "1674". Published in one book together (convolute) with Benedictus de Spinoza's here also anonymous Tractatus theologico-politicus. Added in handwriting: "Benedicto de Spinosâ".

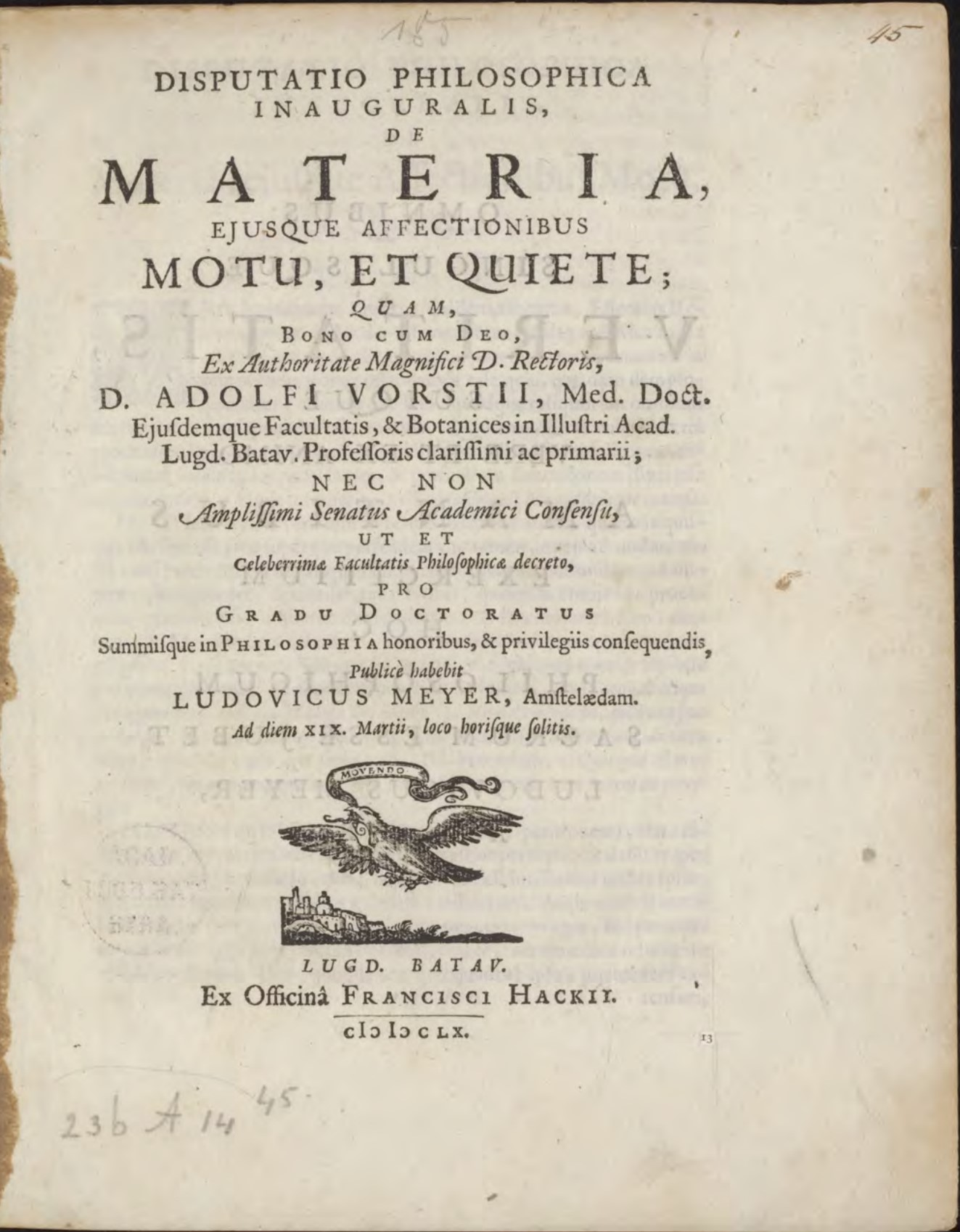
Lodewijk Meyer: De materia, ejusque affectionibus motu, et quiete, dissertation Leiden University, 1660

Lodewijk Meyer (also Meijer) (bapt. 18 October 1629, Amsterdam – buried 25 November 1681, Amsterdam) was a Dutch physician, classical scholar, translator, lexicographer, and playwright. He was a radical intellectual and one of the more prominent members of the circle around the philosopher Benedictus de Spinoza.

He is generally considered the author of an anonymous work, the Philosophia S. Scripturae Interpres, although there are indications that his friend Johannes Bouwmeester may have been the co-author or even the author. It was initially attributed to Spinoza, and caused a furor among preachers and theologians, with its claims that the Bible was in many places opaque and ambiguous; and that philosophy was the only criterion for interpretation of cruxes in such passages. Just after the death of Meyer his friends revealed that he was the author of the work, which had been banned by the Court of Holland together with Spinoza's Tractatus Theologico-Politicus in 1674.

== Works ==
Including:

- 1660:
  - translated: The Principles of Cartesian Philosophy and Metaphysical Thoughts by Baruch Spinoza contains Meyer's Preface and also his Inaugural Dissertation on Matter (1660). It is translated by Samuel Shirley and published by Hackett Publishing Company, Inc., Indianapolis/Cambridge, 1998, ISBN 0-87220-400-6.
  - (in Latin) "De materia, ejusque affectionibus motu, et quiete": Meyer's 1660 Latin dissertation at Leiden University
- 1664 with Benedictus de Spinoza and Pieter Balling (in Dutch): Renatus Des Cartes Beginzelen der wysbegeerte, I en II deel, na de meetkonstige wijze beweezen door Benedictus de Spinoza ... : mitsgaders des zelfs overnatuurkundige gedachten, in welke de zwaarste geschillen ..., kortelijk werden verklaart, Amsterdam: Jan Rieuwertsz. boekverk. in de Dirk van Assensteegh, in 't Martelaars-boek, 1664. (With Meyer's Preface.)
- 1666:
  - with Benedictus de Spinoza (in Latin): Philosophia S. Scripturæ interpres : exercitatio paradoxa, in quâ, veram philosophiam infallibilem S. Literas interpretandi normam esse, apodicticè demonstratur, & discrepantes ab hâc sententiæ expenduntur, ac refelluntur ..., Eleutheropoli [= (Grieks) "Freetown"]: unknown publisher, 1666.
  - translated: Lodewijk Meyer (2005). Philosophy as the interpreter of Holy Scripture (1666). Marquette Studies in Philosophy. Vol. 43. Translated by Samuel Shirley. Milwaukee: Marquette University Press. ISBN 0874626668. translation of Philosophia S. Scripturae Interpres
- 1668 (in Dutch): L. Meijers Ghulde vlies : treurspel, Amsterdam: Jacob Lescailje, 1668
- 1669 (in Dutch): L. Meijers woordenschat, : in drie deelen ghescheiden, van welke het I. bastaardtwoorden, II. konstwoorden, III. verouderde woorden beghrijpt., Amsterdam: weduwe van Jan Hendriksz. Boom, 1669
  - 1688 (in Dutch): L. Meijers woordenschat : verdeelt in 1. Bastaardt-woorden. 2. Konst-woorden. 3. Verouderde woorden., Amsterdam: Jeronimus Ratelband, 1688?, 1745
- 1677, translation by Meyer of Antoine Le Métel d'Ouville (in Dutch): Het spookend weeuwtje, blyspél, Amsterdam: Albert Magnus, 1677
- 1678, translation by Meyer of Jean Racine (in Dutch): Andromaché. Treurspel., Amsterdam: Izaak Duim, bezuiden het Stadhuis, 1678(?), 1744.

== Sources ==
- Wiep van Bunge et al. (editors), The Dictionary of Seventeenth and Eighteenth-Century Dutch Philosophers (2003), Thoemmes Press (two volumes), article Meyer, Lodewijk, p. 694–9.
- Israel, Jonathan I. (1998). The Dutch Republic: Its Rise, Greatness, and Fall, 1477-1806. Oxford: Clarendon Press. pp. 914–920. ISBN 0-19-820734-4.
- Israel, Jonathan I. (2001). Radical Enlightenment: Philosophy and the Making of Modernity, 1650-1750. Oxford, New York: Oxford University Press. pp. 197–205. ISBN 0198206089.
- Nadler, Steven (1999). Spinoza: A Life. Cambridge: Cambridge University Press. pp. 202-207. ISBN 0-521-55210-9.
