= Francis Kuipers =

British-Dutch musician (born 1941)

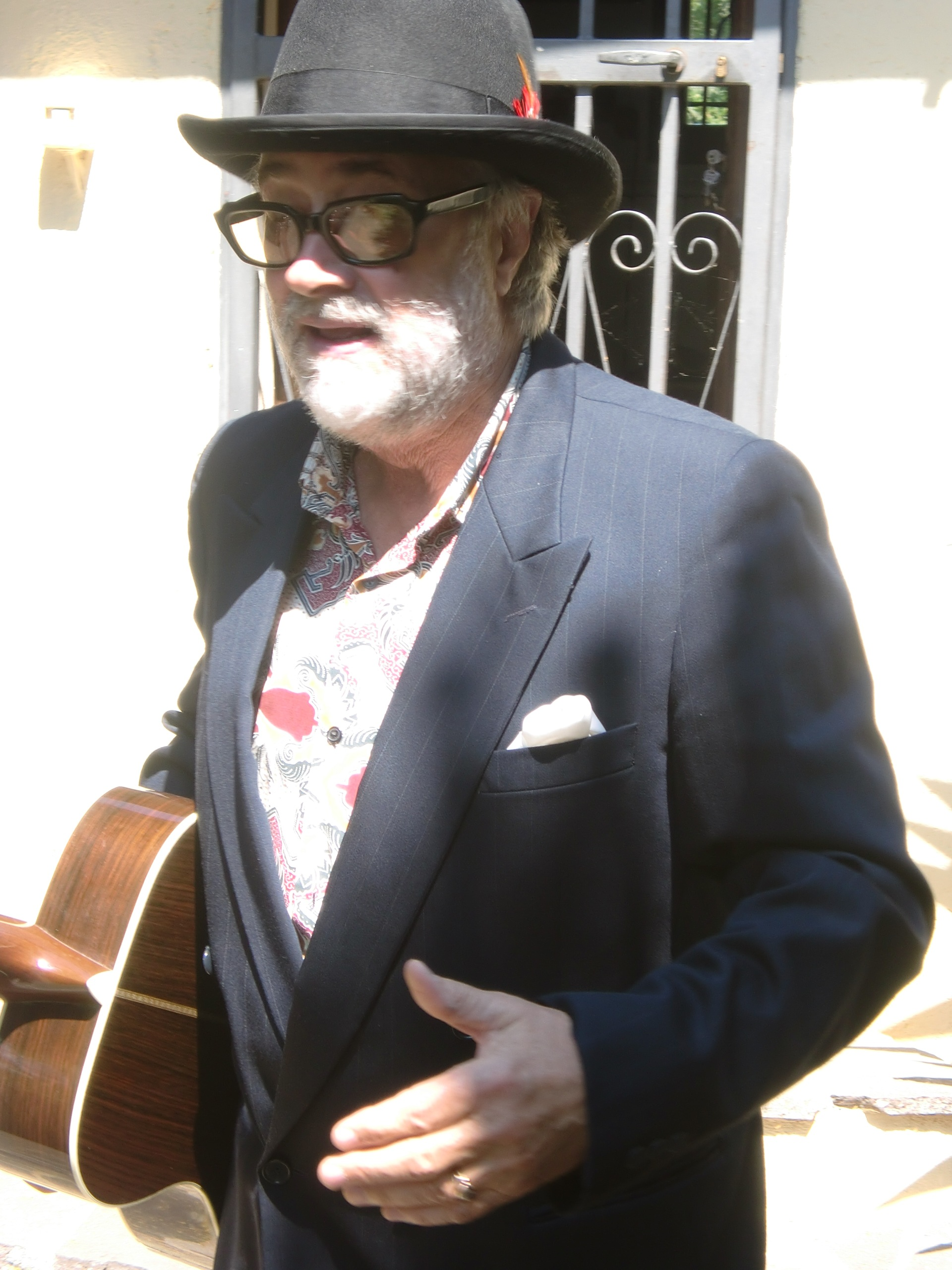
Francis Kuipers

Francis Kuipers (born 1941 in Woking, United Kingdom), also known as Superguitar, is a British-Dutch composer, guitarist and ethno-musicologist domiciled in Italy. In the 1960s he began creating a unique archive of music and sounds, as well as making field recordings in Australasia, Africa, the Seychelles, India and Nepal, the Philippines and North America. He has completed numerous solo tours and played in duos with Antonello Salis, Massimo Urbani, Luis Agudo, Enrico Micheletti, Joe Garceau, Janet Smith, and Champion Jack Dupree, amongst others. In the 1980s he was guitarist for Beat Generation poet Gregory Corso. In Italy he is best known for his guest appearance on the tour of Francesco de Gregori in 1989, and for his many performances at the Folkstudio of Rome. From 1995 to 1998 he directed the department of Music and Sound at Fabrica, the multi-media research center founded by Luciano Benetton and Oliviero Toscani at Treviso. He has collaborated with Godfrey Reggio on the films Anima Mundi, Evidence, Naqoykatsi with the music of Philip Glass and has composed the original music scores for Mary, Napoli Napoli Napoli, Go Go Tales with the voice of Grace Jones, and 4:44 The Last Day on Earth directed by Abel Ferrara.

== Film scores ==
- Anima Mundi 1992, directed by Godfrey Reggio
- Evidence 1995, directed by Godfrey Reggio
- Naqoyqatsi 2000, directed by Godfrey Reggio
- Mary 2005, directed by Abel Ferrara
- Go Go Tales 2007, directed by Abel Ferrara
- Napoli Napoli Napoli 2009, directed by Abel Ferrara
- The Last Day On Earth 2012, directed by Abel Ferrara

== Radio ==
- Blues oggi, Blues ieri, Rai Radio 3
- Folk Concerto, Rai Radio 3
- Controcanto, Rai Radio 3
- Un certo discorso, Rai Radio 3
- Pomeriggio Musicale, Rai Radio 3
- Estate Musicale, Rai Radio 3
- C'era una volta, radio drama series for Rai Educational

== Theatre ==
- Armageddon here I come: composer of original score. Written and directed by Michael Noonan and Alexander Guyan, Auckland, New Zealand
- Tiny Alice, composer of original score. Written by Edward Albee and directed by Abel Ferrara

== Discography ==
- Blindfold Blues, Allrecall (2013)
- Napoli Napoli Napoli, Original Motion Picture Soundtrack, Francis Kuipers (2010)
- Go Go Tales, Original Motion Picture Soundtrack, Original Soundtrack, (2007)
- Mary, Original Motion Picture Soundtrack, Edizioni Gipsy (2005)
- Anthology, Francis Kuipers
- Country Concert. Folkstudio Record, (2000)
- Superguitar, Pineapple Records, (2001)
- Isola Anonima, L'orafo Italiano (1999)
- Gregory Corso with the music of Francis Kuipers, Red Record (1988)
- Folk, Blues & Rags, Fonit Cetra, (1975)
- Country Blues and White Spirituals, (1976) Fonit Cetra
