= Harmen Kuperus =

Dutch footballer and coach

Personal information
- Full name: Harmen Kuperus
- Date of birth: 2 June 1977 (age 49)
- Place of birth: Sneek, Netherlands
- Position: Goalkeeper

Youth career
- SC Heerenveen

Senior career*
| Years | Team | Apps | (Gls) |
| 1996–1997 | Cambuur | 0 | (0) |
| 1997–1999 | Heerenveen | 0 | (0) |
| 1999–2001 | ONS Sneek | | |
| 2001–2003 | Urk | | |
| 2003 | Spakenburg | 17 | (0) |
| 2004 | Cambuur | | |
| 2004–2005 | ASV Dronten | | |
| 2005–2007 | Stormvogels Telstar | 27 | (0) |
| 2007–2008 | Zwolle | 0 | (0) |
| 2008 | → Heerenveen (loan) | 0 | (0) |
| 2008–2009 | Volendam | 0 | (0) |
| 2009–2010 | Telstar | 9 | (0) |
| 2010–2011 | Willem II | 0 | (0) |
| 2011–2012 | Emmen | 0 | (0) |

Managerial career
- 2012–2013: Heerenveen (goalkeeping coach)
- 2013–2014: Go Ahead Eagles (goalkeeping coach)
- 2014–2016: Heerenveen (goalkeeping coach)
- 2017–2018: OH Leuven (goalkeeping coach)
- 2018–2019: Mechelen (goalkeeping coach)
- 2023: Suriname (goalkeeping coach)
- * Club domestic league appearances and goals as of 17 October 2010 (UTC)

Harmen Kuperus (born 2 June 1977) is a Dutch professional retired footballer who played as a goalkeeper and was active as a goalkeeping coach at Mechelen playing the Belgian First Division B until May 7, 2019.

Kuperus was employed by various Dutch teams, including Willem II, Zwolle, Heerenveen, Volendam and Telstar. During his career he was often employed as backup goalkeeper, therefore only playing very few official matches.
