= Adriaan Koerbagh =

Dutch physician, scholar, and writer

Adriaan Koerbagh (1632–1669) was a Dutch physician, scholar, and writer who was a critic of religion and conventional morality. He was in the circle of supporters of Baruch Spinoza.

== Life ==
Adriaan Koerbagh and his younger brother Johannes (1634–1672) were sons of a ceramics maker, who died young leaving them funds allowing them to pursue extended schooling. Adriaan studied at the universities of respectively Utrecht, Franeker and Leiden, becoming a doctor in medicine in 1659 and master in jurisprudence in 1661. He was one of the most radical figures of the Age of Enlightenment, rejecting and reviling the church and state as unreliable institutions and exposing theologians' and lawyers' language as vague and opaque tools to blind the people in order to maintain their own power. Koerbagh put the authority of reason above that of dogmas and was thus seen as a true freethinker, although twentieth century notions of him as an anarchist or libertarian cannot be applied with certainty.

Koerbagh described the Bible and dogmas like the Trinity and the divine nature of Christ as only the work of men. Also, like his contemporary Baruch de Spinoza, he argued that God is identical with nature and that nothing exists outside of nature. Therefore, he argued, natural science, not theology, was the real theology of the world. In his views about the secularization of the Republic of the Netherlands and the limitation of ecclesiastical powers, he argued that religion is irrational and only maintains its position through deception and violence.

He wrote in books 't Nieuw Woorden-Boeck der Regten (The New Dictionary of Rights, 1664), and in Een Bloemhof van allerley lieflijkheyd (A Flower Garden of All Sorts of Delights, 1668), under the pseudonym Vreederijk Waarmond. This book explained various technical terms and foreign words. The Church authorities were offended by the dictionary's articles on religious and political topics, forcing Koerbagh to flee to Culemborg, a legally autonomous town in another province that would not extradite him, and then to Leiden.

Adriaan Koerbagh fiercely opposed the Dutch Reformed Church in his third work, "Een Ligt schynende in duystere plaatsen, om te verligten de voornaamste saaken der Godsgeleerdtheyd en Godsdienst" (A Light Shining In Dark Places, To Shed Light On Matters Of Theology and Religion). He went to Leiden, where he was betrayed by his printer, who knew the contents of his work, and arrested by the authorities. His brother Johannes was also arrested.

In 1668, he was found guilty of blasphemy and was sentenced to 10 years in the Rasphuis jail at Amsterdam, where he had to do forced labour, followed by exile and a 4000 guilder fine. He died a few months later in 1669 in the Rasphuis due to the pressures of prison life. His publications were largely destroyed by the authorities of the Republic. His brother Johannes was released because of lack of evidence against him, but he never published again. He died three years later, in 1672.

== Works ==
- 't Nieuw-woordenboek der Regten (1664)
- Een Bloemhof van allerley lieflijkheyd sonder verdriet (1668)
- Een ligt Schijnende in Duystere Plaatsen, om te verligten de voornaamste saaken der Godsgeleerdtheyd en Godsdienst (1668, reissued 1974)

== Sources ==
- Noordervliet, Nelleke: "Helden van het vrije woord", NRC Handelsblad, 18 June 2007.
- Israel, Jonathan I., Radical Enlightenment: Philosophy and the Making of Modernity 1650–1750; Oxford University Press, USA; 2002.
- _____, Spinoza, Life & Legacy. Oxford: Oxford University Press 2023.
