= William Ames (Quaker) =

English itinerant Quaker preacher and writer (died 1662)

- Born: Somerset, England
- Died: 1662
- Occupations: Preacher, writer

William Ames (died 1662) was an early English itinerant Quaker preacher and writer. He joined the Quakers in 1655 at Dublin, having been a Baptist minister in Somerset, and afterwards a Roundhead officer in the English Civil War. He settled at Amsterdam in 1657, where he was tolerated, though once confined for a short time as a lunatic. Ames zealously preached to the Collegiants, and although initially in accord, they later fell out. He traveled in Germany and was favorably received by Charles I Louis, Elector Palatine. Ames returned to England in 1662, was sent to Bridewell prison for attending a Quaker meeting, and died before the end of the year.

== Life ==
He joined the Quakers in 1655 at Dublin, having been a Baptist minister in Somerset, and afterwards a Roundhead officer in the English Civil War. He settled at Amsterdam in 1657, where he was tolerated, though once confined for a short time as a lunatic. Ames zealously preached to the Collegiants and they were initially in accord although later they fell out. He travelled in Germany, and was favourably received by Charles I Louis, Elector Palatine. He returned to England in 1662, was sent to Bridewell for attending a Quaker meeting, and died before the end of the year.

== Works ==
He wrote a large number of tracts in Dutch, the titles of which are given in Joseph Smith's Catalogue of Friends' Books.

== See also ==
- The Light upon the Candlestick

== Sources ==
- This article incorporates text from a publication now in the public domain: "Ames, William (d.1662)". Dictionary of National Biography. London: Smith, Elder & Co. 1885–1900.
