= De Kuyper =

de Kuyper or Dekuyper is a surname. Notable people with this surname include:

- Petrus De Kuyper, founder of DeKuyper
- Calvin Dekuyper (born 2000) Belgian football player
- Eric de Kuyper (born 1942) Belgian-Flemish-Dutch artist
