= Collegiants =

Dutch Christian denomination

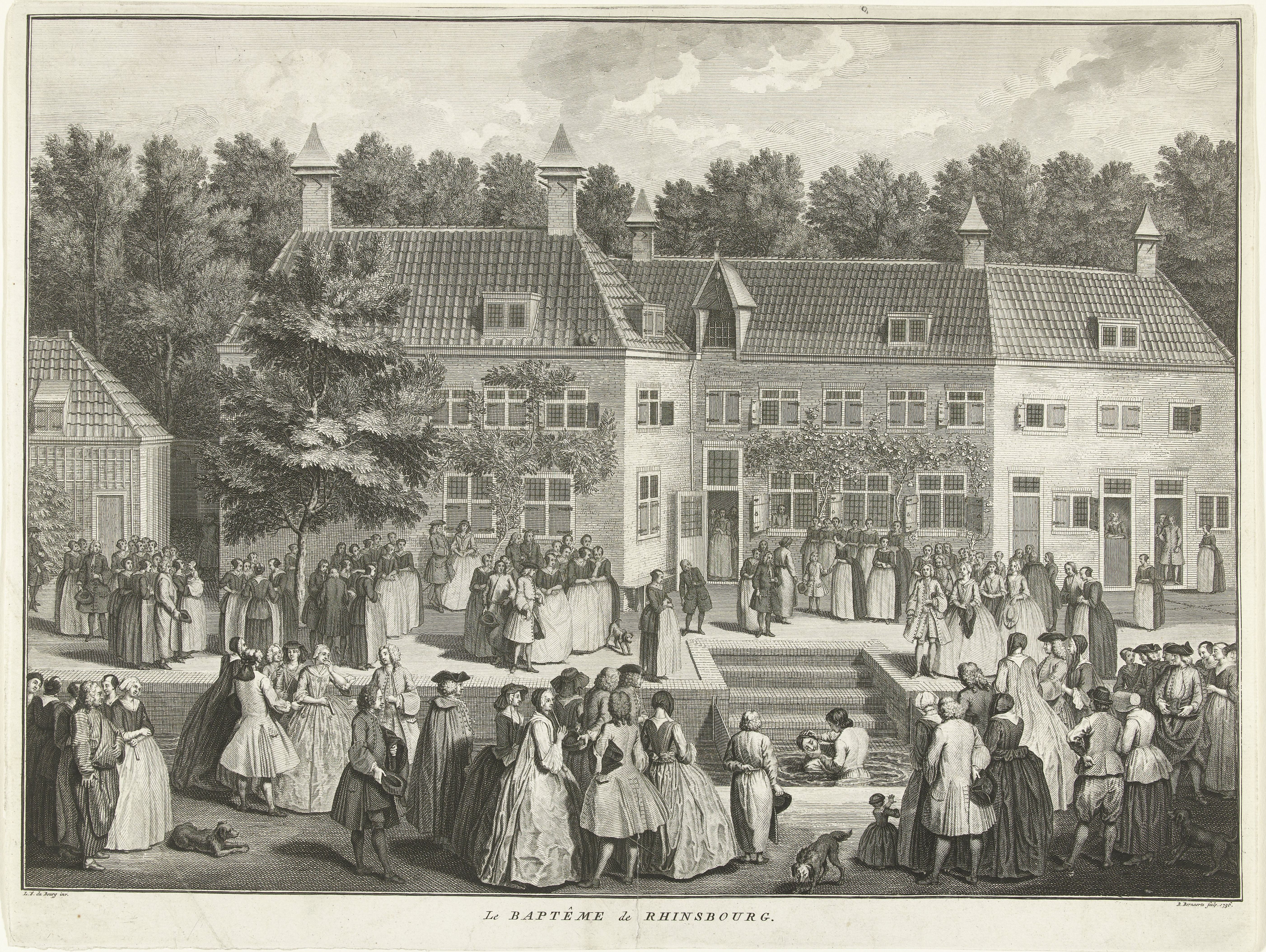
'Grote Huis', Rijnsburg, baptism, ca. 1735 (Balthasar Bernards, after Louis Fabricius Dubourg, 1736)

In Christian history, the Collegiants (Latin: Collegiani; Dutch: Collegianten), also called Collegians, were an association, founded in 1619 among the Arminians and Anabaptists in Holland. They were so called because of their colleges (meetings) held the first Sunday of each month, at which everyone had the same liberty of expounding the scripture and praying.

== History ==
Collegiants were an association, founded in 1619 among the Arminians and Anabaptists in Holland. The practice originated in 1619 when, after the Synod of Dort forced the States of Holland to dismiss clerics for encouraging refuge to individuals being persecuted for religious beliefs, three brothers of Warmond by the name of van der Kodde (or Codde)—Gijsbert, Jan Jacobsz, and Adriaen—decided to hold religious services of their own. The sect began as a refuge from the bitterness of the Calvinist and Arminian controversies of the day. Their name is derived from the custom they had of calling their communities "Colleges", as did Spener and the Pietists of Germany.

The Collegiants' first place of meeting was at the village of Warmond, at the residence of one of the brothers, but they shortly established their headquarters at Rijnsburg, a village 2.5 mi (4.0 km) northwest from Leiden, and were hence called the Rijnsburgers (Dutch: Rijnsburger Collegianten). In Rijnsburg, the Collegiants had a guest-quarter in the present-day alleyway of Kwakelsteeg called the Grote Huis (Large House).

There were also large communities of Collegiants in other places, for instance in Amsterdam and Hoorn. The Amsterdam college was founded in 1646 by Adam Boreel as a spiritualist cell, like those of Sebastian Franck and Kaspar Schwenkfeld, but Daniel De Breen, a Leiden-educated Remonstrant theologian, brought the college in line with Rijinsburger principles. A disaffected Mennonite, Galenus Abrahamsz (or Abrahamson), brought many other Mennonites to the Amsterdam college. In Amsterdam, the Collegiants ran an orphanage, 'De Oranjeappel', where the Dutch writer Aagje Deken was raised.

== Belief and practice ==
Their principle from the beginning had been to admit all individuals to their society who were willing to acknowledge their belief in the Bible as inspired scripture, and to take it as a guide for Christian life; but no confession of faith was used, and the widest diversity of opinion was permitted. Their form of worship consisted of prayer meetings held on Sundays and Wednesdays, at which any men of the community might pray and expound the scripture, but there was no regular organization of a ministry among them. They recognized the necessity of baptism, which they administered by immersion, and twice a year they had a sacramental meeting extending over several days, similar to those of the Scottish Presbyterians.

== The Collegiants and Spinoza ==
Benedict Spinoza joined the study groups of the Collegiants while living near Leiden from 1660 to 1663. It was during this period that he began working on his major book, The Ethics. At the end of the 17th century, the opinions of Spinoza had obtained a strong hold upon the Collegiants, and caused a temporary division of their members into two parties, with separate places of meeting. The leader of the Spinozist party was John Bredenburg, a merchant of Rotterdam, and he was opposed by a bookseller from Amsterdam, named Francis Couper, who attained some eminence by a work which he wrote against Bredenburg under the title Arcana Atheismi detecta ("The Secrets of Atheism Revealed"); he was also the publisher of the Bibliotheca Fratrum Polonorum seu Unitariorum. The two parties were reunited on the death of these two controversialists, and attracted many to their society from other sects during the 18th century.

== Final years as a religious group and ongoing legacy ==
The last (open) meetings of the Collegiants were held in Rijnsburg om 27 May 1787, in Rotterdam on 9 September 1788, and in Amsterdam in 1791. The last baptism in Rijnsburg was in 1801. The center in Rijnsburg was sold in 1828, after the last Collegiant had died. The orphanage of the Collegiants called 'De Oranjeappel' survives to this day as a foundation promoting youth work ("Stichting Weeshuis der Doopsgezinde Collegianten "De Oranjeappel").

== See also ==
- The Light upon the Candlestick

== Notes and references ==
=== Sources ===
- Blunt, John Henry (1874). Dictionary of Sects, Heresies, Ecclesiastical Parties, and Schools of Religious Thought. Rivingtons. p. 110.
- Chambers, Ephraim (1728). "Collegiants". Cyclopaedia, or an Universal Dictionary of Arts and Sciences. New York: James and John Knapton.
- Fix, Andrew Cooper (1991). Prophecy and Reason: The Dutch Collegiants in the Early Enlightenment. Princeton: Princeton University Press. p. 45.
- Loosjes, A.; Thompson, Garrett (1925). Het weeshuis der Collegianten "De Oranjeappel" 1675–1925 (in Dutch). [Hilversum]: Weeshuis "De Oranjeappel".
- MK (2006). "Plangebied: inventarisatie en onderzoek (Plan area: Inventory and research)" (PDF). Municipality of Katwijk (in Dutch). Archived from the original (PDF) on 28 September 2007.
- Thompson, Daniel; Thompson, Garrett (2006). The Longman Standard History of Philosophy. Pearson Longman. p. 423.
- van Loon, Hendrik Willem (2004). Life & Times of Rembrandt. Kessinger Publishing. p. 532.
