= Bidloo =

Bidloo is a surname of Flemish origin. A notable family by that name were the Amsterdam Mennonites of the later Dutch Golden Age.

- Govert Bidloo (1649–1713), Dutch professor of anatomy, poet, playwright, physician to William III of England
- Lambert Bidloo (1638–1724), older brother of Govert, Dutch apothecary, controversialist, poet, translator
- Nicolaas Bidloo (1674–1731), son of Lambert, physician to Peter the Great, father of Russian medicine
