= Lambert Bidloo =

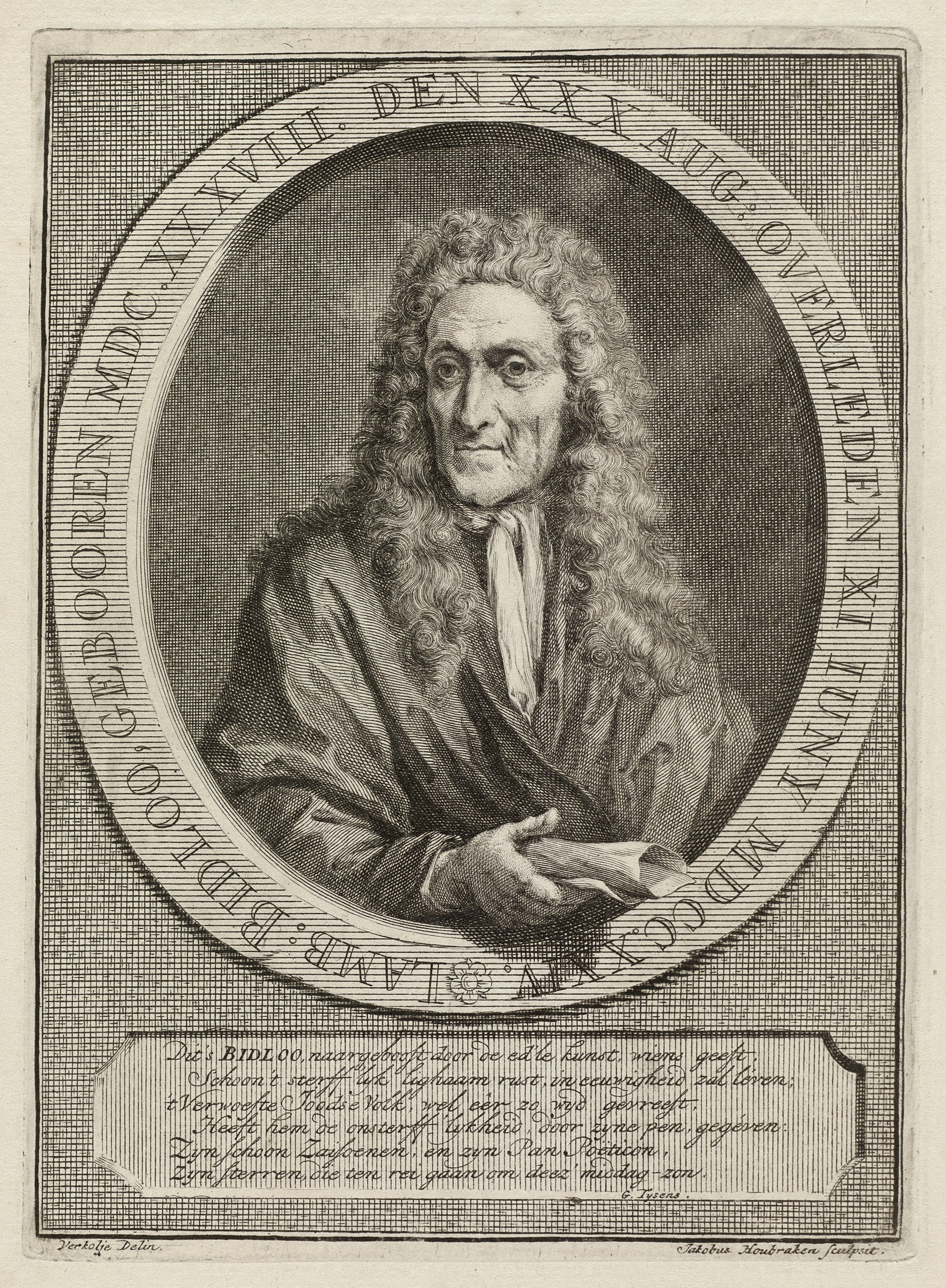
- Lambert Bidloo, by Jacobus Houbraken
- Born: 30 August 1638; Amsterdam
- Died: 11 June 1724; Amsterdam
- Occupations: Pharmacist, writer

Lambert Bidloo (30 August 1638 – 11 June 1724), of Amsterdam, was by religion, a Zonist Mennonite, by profession, an apothecary and botanist and by passion, a man of letters and translator. After a solid education in classical letters and a period of apprenticeship, Lambert joined the apothecaries' and surgeon's guild overseeing standards and education at the Collegium Medicum. In 1688, he became the director of this institution, and, along with associates and collaborators, botanist Jan Commelin and anatomist Frederik Ruysch he had a hand in its herbalist Hortus Medicus flowering into the global Hortus Botanicus (Amsterdam) of today. His various learned works in Latin and Dutch deal with plants, with Mennonite religious issues and with different historical themes, contemporary, biblical and literary. Among these Bidloo is best known for the curious Panpoeticon Batavum, (Amsterdam, 1720), a figurative and visual poet's gallery of Golden Age Dutch literature. This he produced as a joint undertaking with the noted artist and art historian Arnold Houbraken who was then also launching The Great Theatre of Dutch Painters, (Amsterdam, 1718–21).

== Early life ==
Lambert was the first son of Mennonites Maria Lambertz Fellers and Govert Bidloo, (b. 1603), a hatter by trade. Govert was thirty five when his first son was born in 1638. Eleven years later a second son, Govert, named after himself, was born in 1649. Both brothers pursued scientific careers: Lambert in botany as an apothecary, and Govert in anatomy and as a professor of surgery. As writers, both wrote many poems, religious treatises, scientific and historical works and translations, and theatrical and musical pieces, including the first Dutch opera.

In contemporary Amsterdam, Bidloo's intellectual and literary pretensions were perceived as conceited. He was not the only poet-pharmacist of his time: Joannes Antonides van der Goes, a noted disciple of the great poet Vondel was not only a fellow pharmacist but a Mennonite as well, along with Jan Brouwer.

== "Amstela dulcis" ==
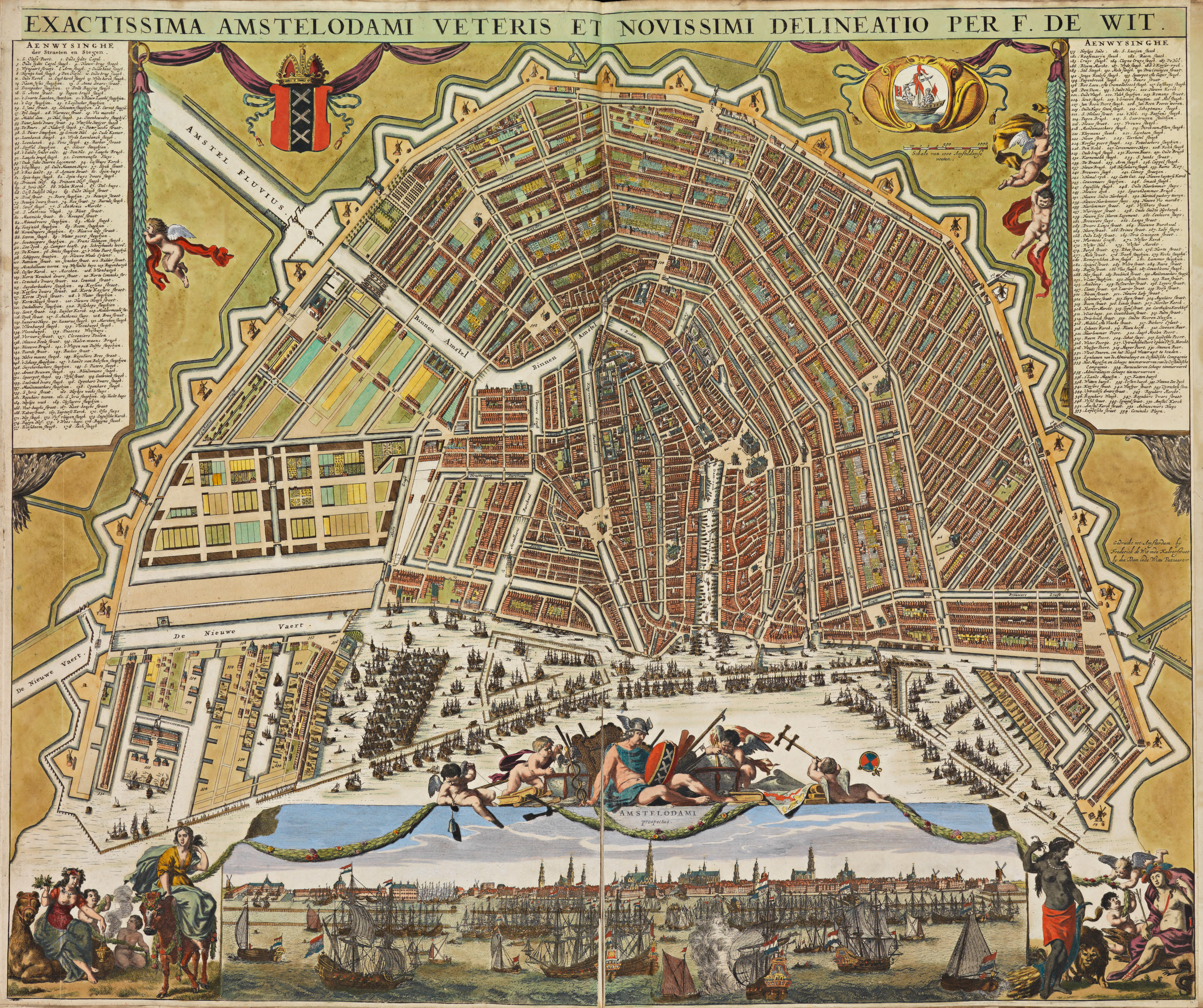
Amsterdam 1688

In 1665, Bidloo's first publication—Menno's Church—was printed as part of the "Lammerenkrijg" among the Amsterdam Mennonites. From his marriage with Maria van der Lys in 1666 he had four children: John, a merchant who settled in Lisbon; Maria, who became her father's amanuensis; Nicolaas Bidloo, who went to Russia and served as a personal physician to Peter the Great; and Celia, who married Cornelis De Bree, compass maker. In 1672 (also known as the Rampjaar), Bidloo composed a mythological paean to the Batavian river gods who had rescued Holland from the French and English river deities set on Dutch destruction. His Latin poem "Amstela dulcis" appeared in 1674. It recounts the upheavals of war on land and sea, including the flooding of the Dutch Water Line and the rescue of Amsterdam from the country's occupation by Louis XIV. The work is dedicated to two men at the top of Amsterdam's political leadership: burgomaster Gillis Valckenier and counselor Johannes Hudde. It appeared after the De Witt brothers' deaths.

== "De re herbaria" ==
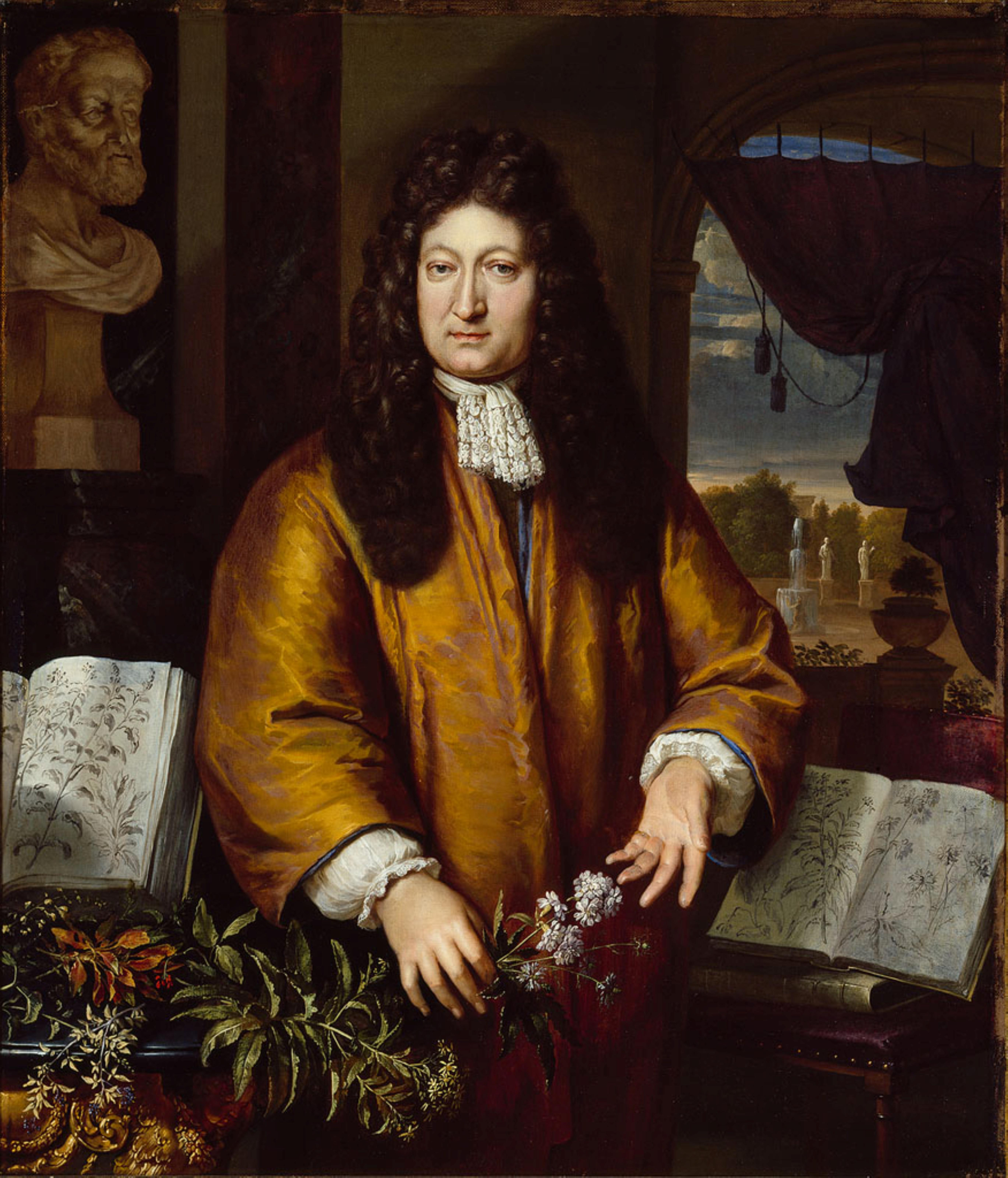
Botanist author Jan Commelin, 1629-1692, by Gerard Hoet. Bust of Pliny the Elder in niche)

Lambert trained as an apothecary at the Athenaeum Illustre of Amsterdam where Latin was the language of instruction and a professional requirement. Aside from studying botany, chemistry, and pharmacology, he also became proficient with languages.

Commelin's first publication was in Dutch Nederlands Hesperides 1676. This treatise on lemon and orange trees in Holland was published in English in 1683. In the same year, Commelin's first work in Latin was published in collaboration with Bidloo. Commelin's Catalogus plantarum indigenarum Hollandiae opens with Bidloo's essay "De re herbaria".

In 1688, Bidloo was elected as the supervisor of the medical college. At the time, Bidloo's intellectual and literary pretensions were perceived as conceited.

== "Zonist" Mennonite ==
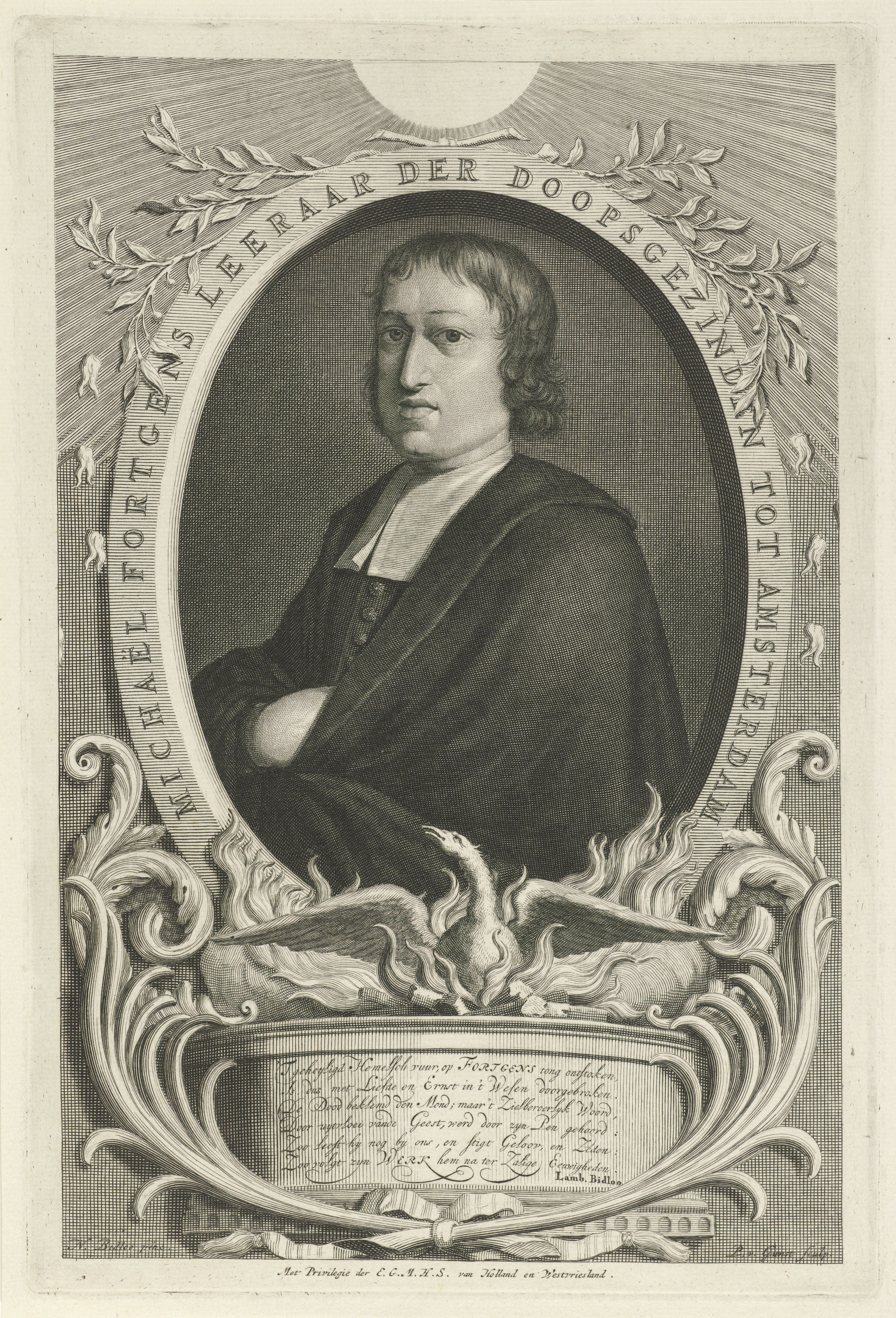
Michiel Fortgens, 1663-1695, Mennonite preacher of the Zonists. Likeness drawn by Nicolaas Bidloo, encomium in Dutch, Lambert Bidloo

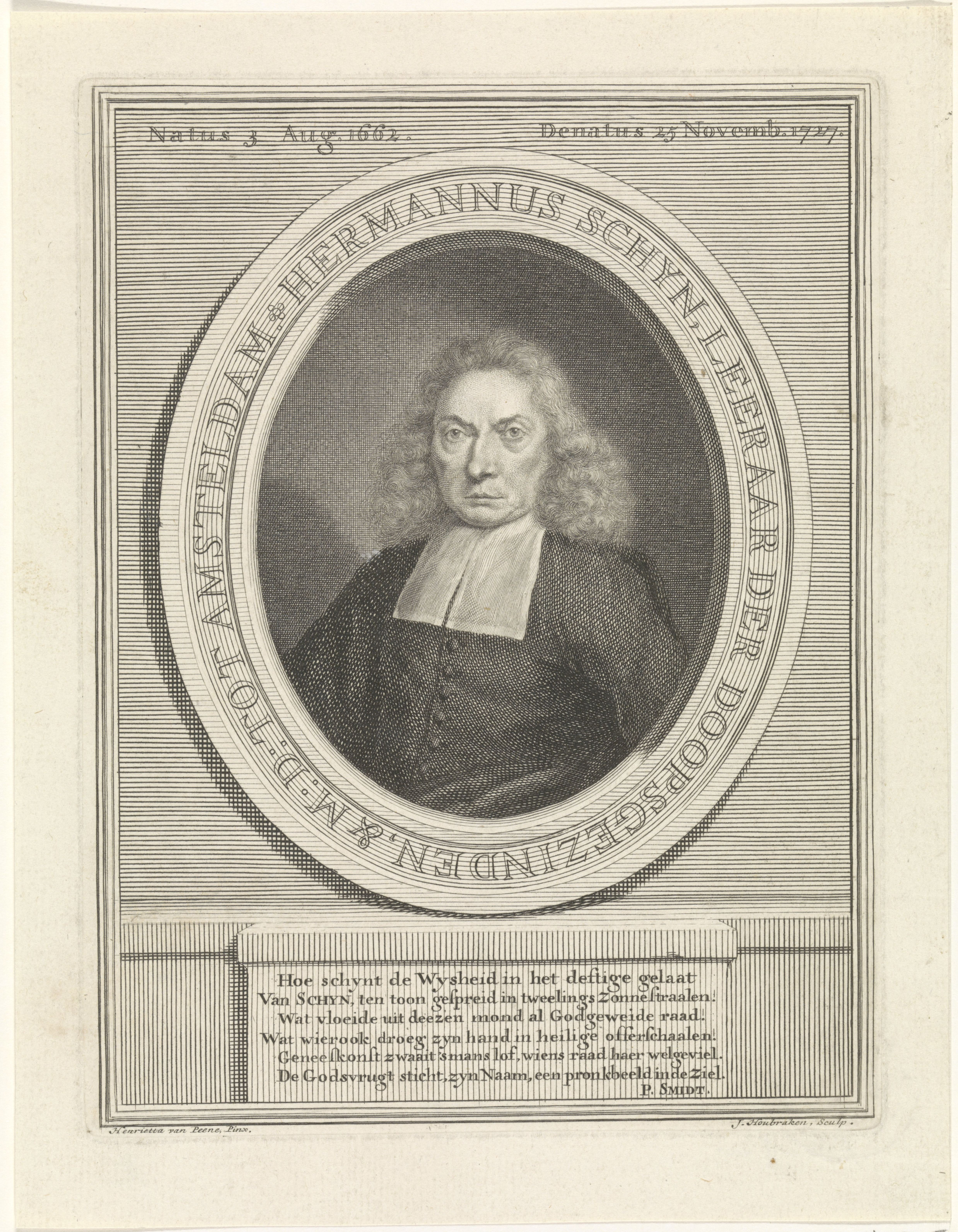
Herman Schijn, 1662-1727, Zonist minister and Mennonite historian

Bidloo was a leading member of the Amsterdam Mennonites called "Zonists" for the name of their meeting place on the Singelgracht, "op te Zon". The Mennonites (also known as Doopgezinden) were an independent Anabaptist group originating in the Netherlands at the onset of the Protestant Reformation. During the Munster Rebellion (1534–35), a splinter group staged a temporary social revolution which endangered their existence and were ostracised for their role in the Radical Reformation. The group was severely persecuted for their dissident beliefs, such as believer's baptism, foot washing, "defenseless" pacifism, and the ban on swearing oaths. These Mennonite principles are enumerated in the 18 points of the Dordrecht Confession of Faith (1632). By Bidloo's time his church was emerging from its clandestine status into congregational meetings that were tolerated by the Calvinist officialdom out of the public eye. By 1660 the differences between liberals and conservatives provoked a major schism among the Mennonites that would persist, despite repeated attempts at reunification, until 1801. The liberal "Lamist" Mennonites were led by Galenus Abramsz de Hann while the conservative "Zonists" were led by Samuel Apostool. The Zonists disapproved of the Lamists' practices; therefore, they set up their own congregation and organized against what they saw as the betrayal of their traditions and the heresy of their former co-religionists.

Bidloo was a fervid Zonist from the beginning of the schism and wrote contentious pamphlets against the Lamists' more inclusive and tolerant views of the "Flemish" congregation: "Op te Lamm". Bidloo's contemporary and fellow Zonist, Thieleman J. van Braght, produced a martyrology—Martyrs Mirror—for his co-religionists. The book became a fundamental text for all Anabaptists, especially through Jan Luiken's illustrated second edition of 1685. In a similar vein, but with a smaller scope was one of the first publications of Lambert's brother Govert, Letters of the Marytyred Apostles (1675). During Govert's lifetime there were 20 editions of his work which include a poem contributed "by his brother". While Mennonite beliefs were an important components in the art (Rembrandt) and poetry (Vondel) of the Dutch Golden Age, Bidloo's conservative religious beliefs distanced him from the Dutch origins of the "Radical Enlightenment".

== Panpoeticon Batavum ==
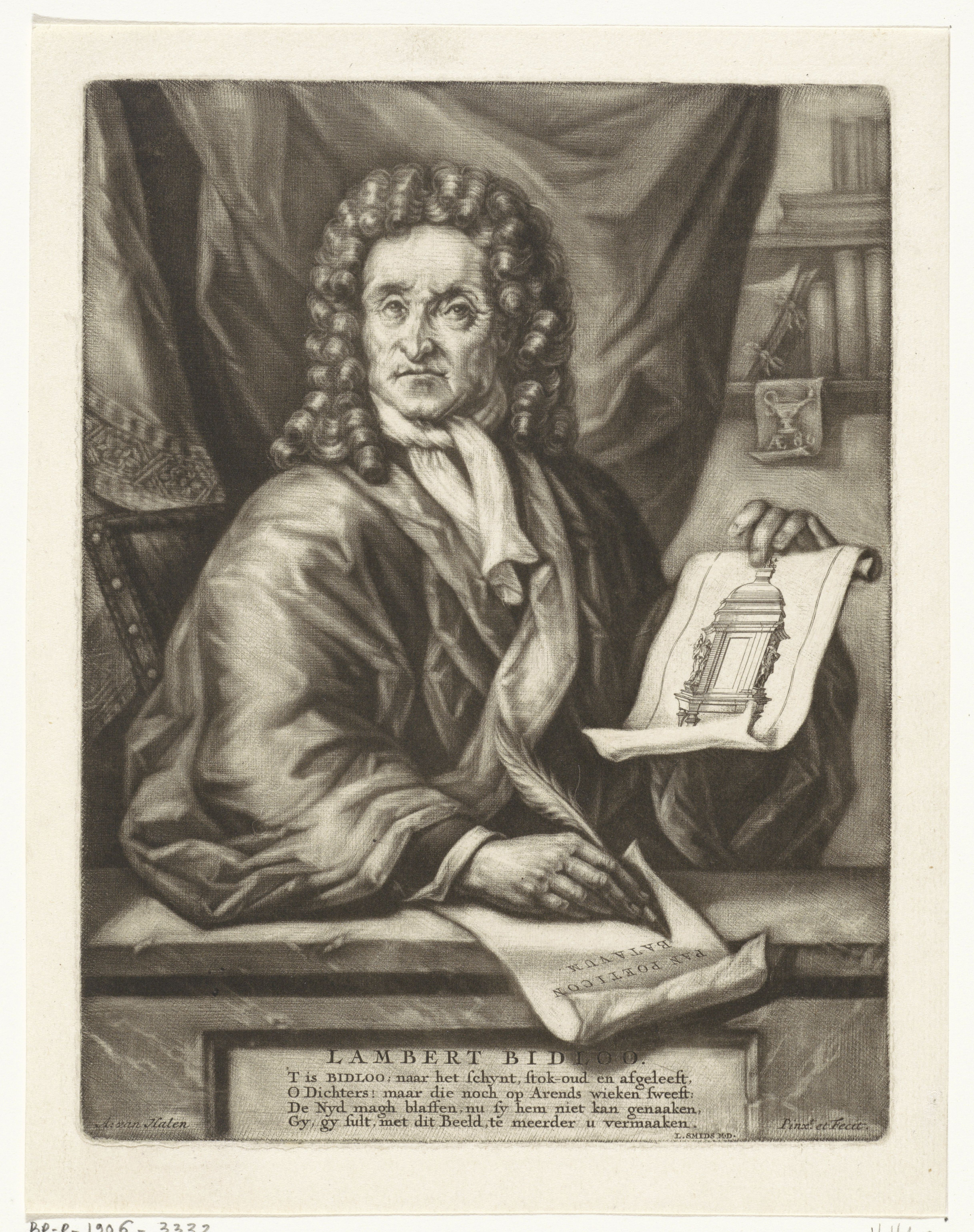
Lambert Bidloo, presenting his ""Kabinet" Panpoeticon Batavum.Mezzotint by Arnoud van Halen

Bidloo contributed poems to artist Arnoud van Halen as part of the Panpoeticon Batavum (1720). This, Bidloo's best known work, is the poetic component of a fascinating gallery of miniature portraits, partially preserved in the Rijksmuseum. Bidloo's poetic review of the best Dutch writers constitutes one of the first historical presentations of this literary tradition.

== Een Geletterd Man verdadigd en verbeterd ==
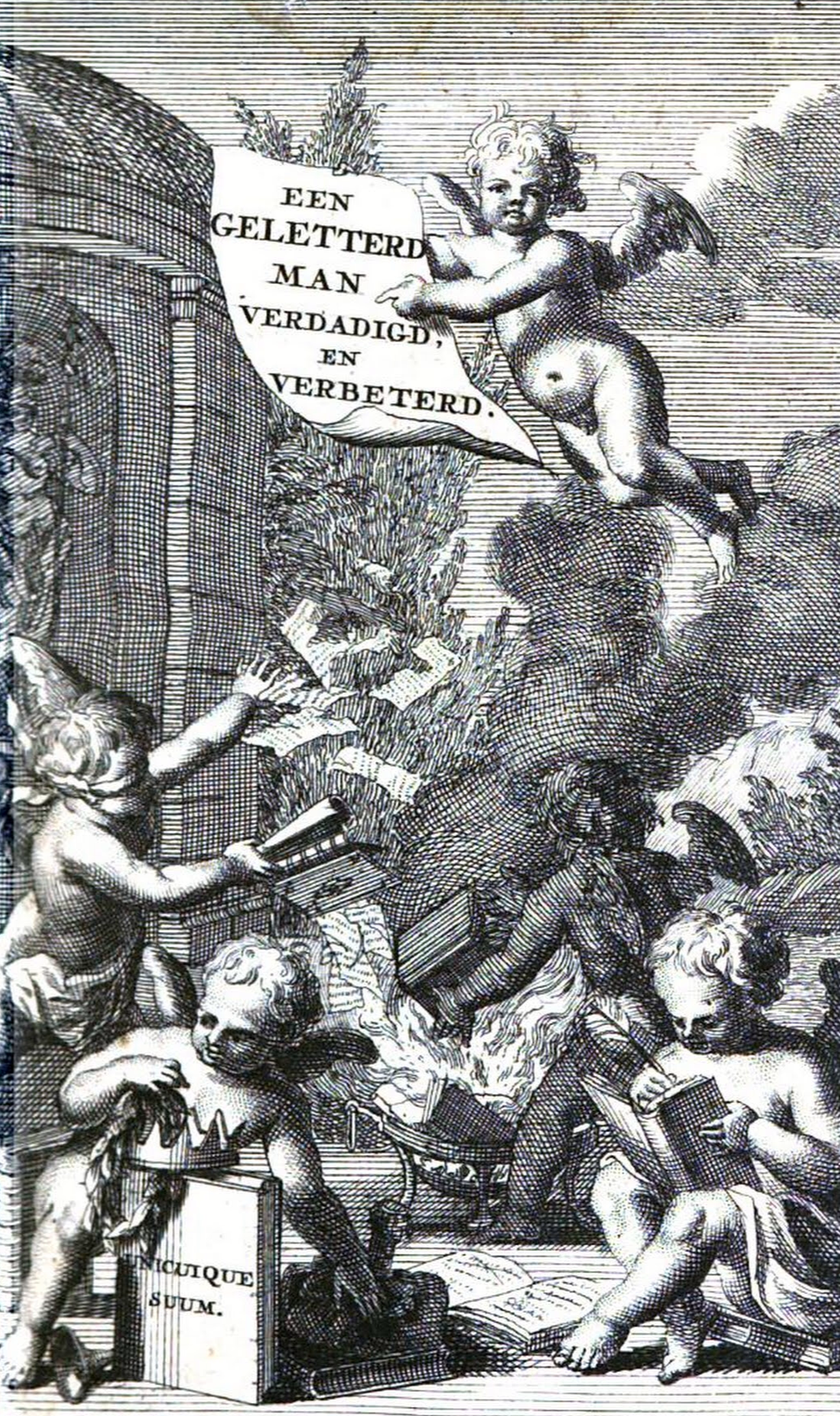
Een Geletterd Man verdadigd en verbeterd, 1722

Among several projects the elderly Bidloo fulfilled his commitment to translate L'huomo di lettere (1645) of the Ferrarese Jesuit writer, Daniello Bartoli (1608-1685). For those aspiring to the title of man of letters this treatise was celebrated as the template of Italian eloquence during Bartoli's lifetime. By 1722 the book had been translated into German, French, Latin, English, and Spanish. Bidloo's Dutch rendering of the Italian work is entitled Een Geletterd Man verdadigd en verbeterd, proposing the defense and bettering of Bartoli's "lettered" man, as a Stoic model of Christian humanism. His preface begins with a dedication to his faithful daughter Maria, his "bibliothecaria". In his foreword Bidloo describes his introduction to Bartoli's Baroque bestseller years earlier at the Congress of Nijmegen (1677–78) by the papal nuncio of Innocent XI. This dignitary, Aloysius Bevilacqua, touted it to him as a challenging literary summa. Before the text there are several occasional poems attached by other poets, including fellow Mennonite Pieter Langendijk. Bidloo innovates by adding numbers to the series of headings; in Part I, 1-11; Part II, 1-27 . After Lambert's death in 1724, Hendrik Bosch, his Amsterdam printer, together with his two daughters as publishers, issued a final work in three volumes on the resonant theme of the downfall of the Jewish people.
