= Panpoeticon Batavum =

Collection of portraits by Arnoud van Halen

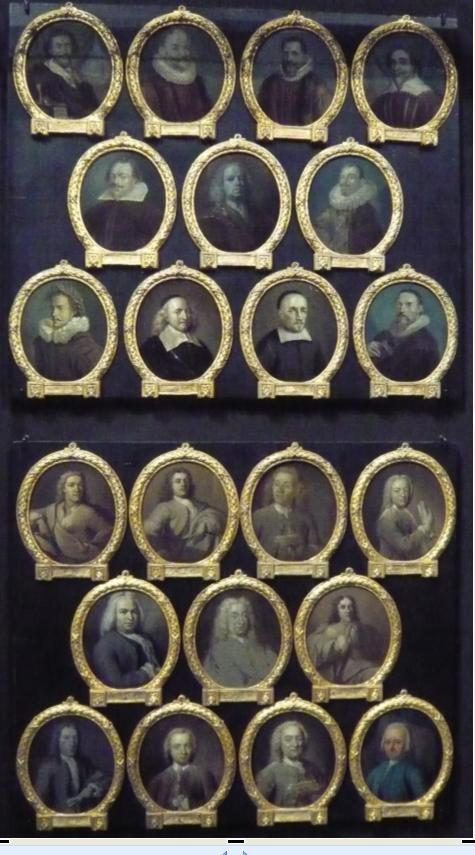
Two plates of the Pan Poëticon Batavum on show in the Rijksmuseum Amsterdam

The Pan Poëticon Batavum was a collection of small portraits of poets mounted on plates that were kept in a curiosity cabinet by the 18th-century Dutch painter Arnoud van Halen.

== History of the collection ==
Van Halen began assembling his collection around 1700 by painting miniature portraits himself that he copied from engravings. For contemporary poets he enlisted the help of friends and colleagues. Before he died, Van Halen managed to collect 346 portraits. Currently, 80 of them are part of the collection of the Rijksmuseum in Amsterdam. Van Halen's cabinet was very popular, and consequently several books mentioned it or had it as a subject. These books included Schouburgh by Arnold Houbraken. Houbraken claimed that the cabinet held portraits of over 100 people (Houbraken was writing in 1712).

== History of the book ==
The most notable book was published by the man who purchased this collection after Van Halen died in 1732, Michiel de Roode. De Roode published the book in 1773 as a member of Leiden's learned society ‘Kunst wordt door arbeid verkreegen’ (art is accomplished by work) which paid for the edition. That the book was popular is attested by the fact that in 1808 the Teyler's Stichting gave Wybrand Hendriks the request to purchase it for up to 500 guilders at auction, and Hendriks bought it for 200 guilders.

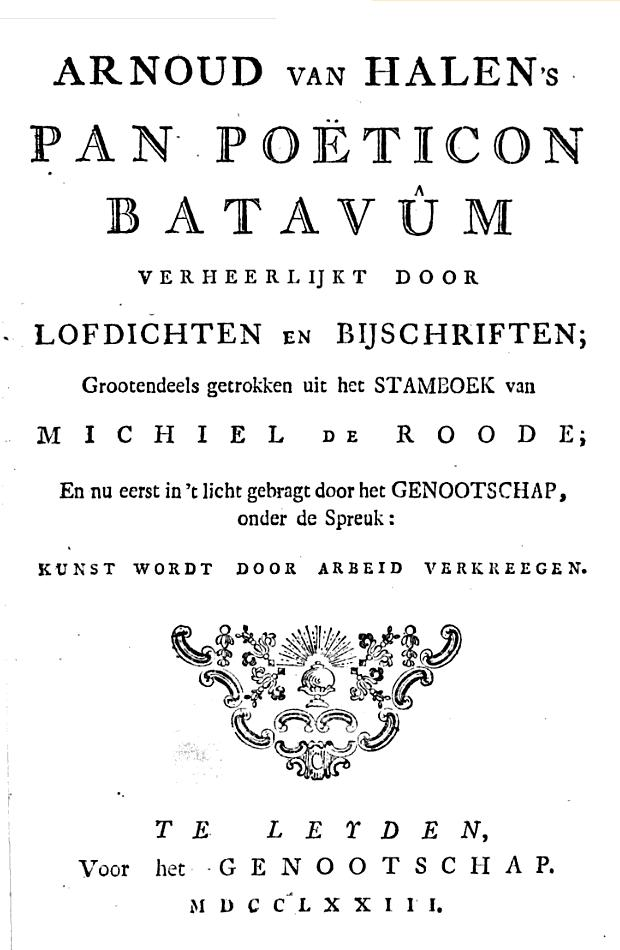
Title page of the book published by ‘Kunst wordt door arbeid verkreegen’ in 1773

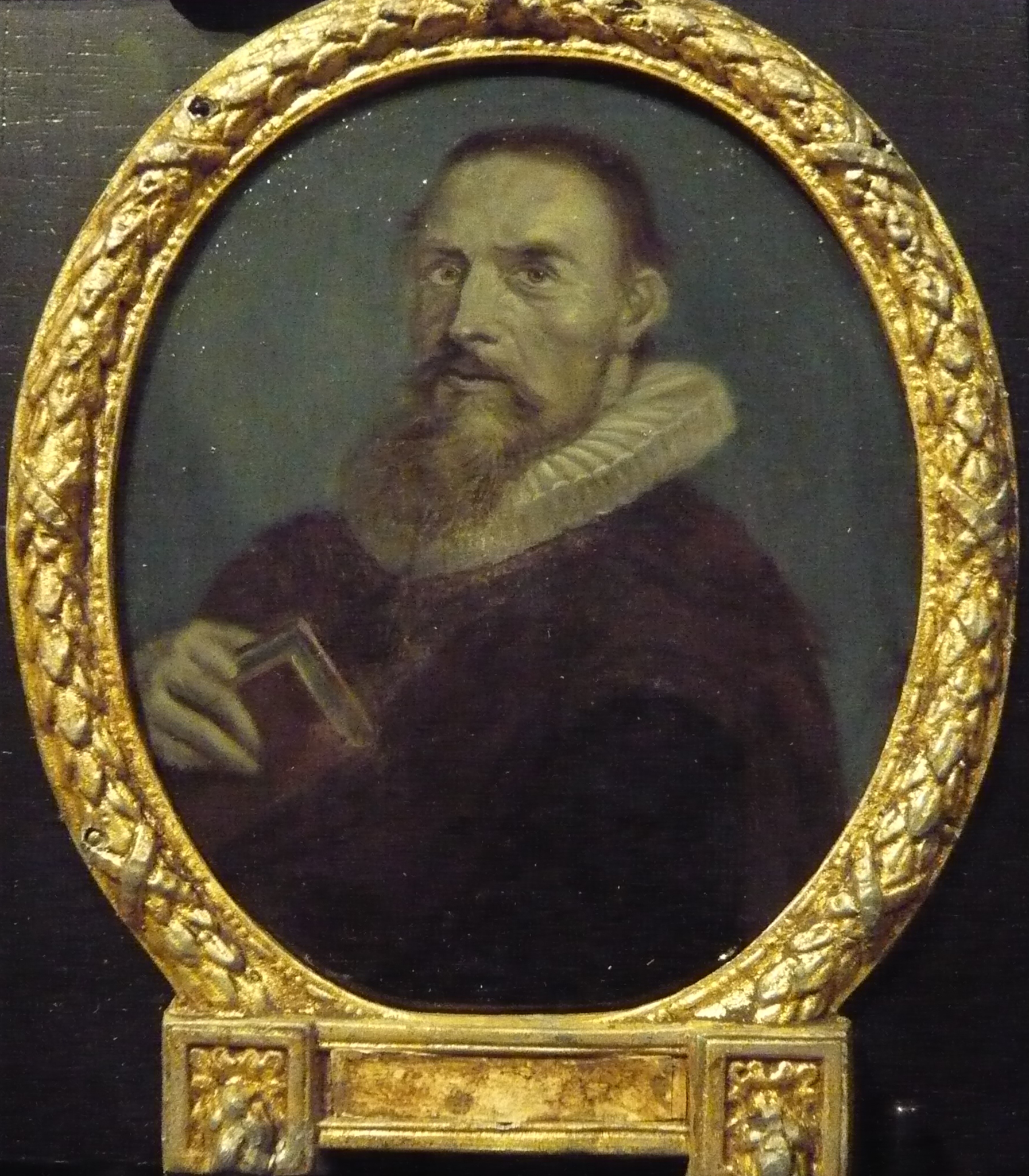
Portrait of Samuel Ampzing after an engraving by Jonas Suyderhoef after a portrait by Frans Hals

An incomplete list of poet portraits:

image	Article	inception	collection	inventory number	creator
	Portrait of Bernardus de Bosch I (1709-1786), Poet and Art Patron in Amsterdam	1743	Rijksmuseum	SK-A-791; SK-A-4625	Jan Maurits Quinkhard
	Portrait of Theodoor van Snakenburg, Jurist and Poet in Leiden	1743	Rijksmuseum	SK-A-4832	Hieronymus van der Mij
	Portrait of Pierius Winsemius, Professor of Rhetoric and History in Franeker		Rijksmuseum	SK-A-1503	Jan Maurits Quinkhard
	Portrait of Frans Greenwood, Miniaturist, Glass Engraver and Poet in Dordrecht		Rijksmuseum	SK-A-1968	Aert Schouman
	Portrait of Matheus de Casteleyn, Priest and Rhetorician in Oudenaarde		Rijksmuseum	SK-A-4553	Jan Maurits Quinkhard
	Jason Pratensis (1486-1558), physician of Zierikzee		Rijksmuseum	SK-A-4554	Jan Maurits Quinkhard
	Portrait of Petrus Bertius, Professor at Leiden		Rijksmuseum	SK-A-4556	Arnoud van Halen
	Portrait of Johannes Polyander à Kerckhoven, Professor of Theology in Leiden		Rijksmuseum	SK-A-4557	Arnoud van Halen
	Portrait of Johan van der Does the Younger, Librarian in Leiden		Rijksmuseum	SK-A-4558	Arnoud van Halen
	Portrait of Theodorus Velius, Writer of the Chronicle of Horn		Rijksmuseum	SK-A-4559	Jan Maurits Quinkhard
	Portrait of Theodorus Schrevelius (1572-1653)		Rijksmuseum	SK-A-4560	Arnoud van Halen
	Portrait of Jacob van den Eynde, Governor of Woerden		Rijksmuseum	SK-A-4561	Arnoud van Halen
	Portrait of Jan van der Rosieren (born 1581)		Rijksmuseum	SK-A-4563	Arnoud van Halen
	Portrait of Jacobus Schotte, Burgomaster of Middelburg		Rijksmuseum	SK-A-4564	Jan Maurits Quinkhard
	Portrait of Adriaen Pietersz van de Venne (1589-1662)		Rijksmuseum	SK-A-4565	Arnoud van Halen
	Portrait of Samuel Ampzing (ca.1591-1632)		Rijksmuseum	SK-A-4566	Arnoud van Halen
	Portrait of Jan Jansz Starter (1594-1626)		Rijksmuseum	SK-A-4567	Arnoud van Halen
	Portrait of Florentius Schoonhoven, Poet in Latin, Burgomaster of Gouda		Rijksmuseum	SK-A-4568	Arnoud van Halen
	Portrait of Constantijn Huygens, Poet, Secretary to Prince Frederick Henry and Prince William II and First Councilor and Exchequer to William III		Rijksmuseum	SK-A-4570	Jan Maurits Quinkhard
	Portrait of Willem de Groot, Lawyer and Writer		Rijksmuseum	SK-A-4571	Jan Maurits Quinkhard
	Portrait of Cornelis Hendriksz Udemans, Poet in Veere		Rijksmuseum	SK-A-4572	Jan Maurits Quinkhard
	Portrait of Jan van der Veen, Pharmacist and Poet in Deventer		Rijksmuseum	SK-A-4574	Arnoud van Halen
	Portrait of Jacob Lescailje, Bookdealer and Poet in Amsterdam		Rijksmuseum	SK-A-4576	Jan Maurits Quinkhard
	Portrait of Joannes Cools (born 1611), Jurist, Historian and Latin Poet in Hoorn		Rijksmuseum	SK-A-4578	Arnoud van Halen
	Portrait of Marcus Zuërius van Boxhorn, Historian and Professor at Leiden		Rijksmuseum	SK-A-4579	Arnoud van Halen
	Portrait of Willem Jacobsz van Heemskerck, Poet and Engraver on Glass		Rijksmuseum	SK-A-4581	Arnoud van Halen
	Portrait of the painter Bonaventura Peeters I (1614-52)		Rijksmuseum	SK-A-4582	Arnoud van Halen
	Portrait of Alexander Morus, Professor at Amsterdam		Rijksmuseum	SK-A-4584	Arnoud van Halen
	Portrait of Everard Meyster, Poet in Utrecht		Rijksmuseum	SK-A-4586	Arnoud van Halen
	Portrait of Joan van Paffenrode, Baron of Ghussigny, Dramatic Poet		Rijksmuseum	SK-A-4587	Arnoud van Halen
	Portrait of Willem Ogier, Dramatic Poet in Antwerp		Rijksmuseum	SK-A-4588	Arnoud van Halen
	Portrait of Jan Six (1618-1700)		Rijksmuseum	SK-A-4589	Arnoud van Halen
	Portrait of Johan van Nijenborgh, Poet in Groningen		Rijksmuseum	SK-A-4590	Arnoud van Halen
	Portrait of Sibylle van Griethuysen (ca.1620-na 1662)		Rijksmuseum	SK-A-4591	Arnoud van Halen
	Jan Vos (c. 1620-67), Amsterdam poet		Rijksmuseum	SK-A-4592	Arnoud van Halen
	Portrait of Caspar van Kinschot, Poet		Rijksmuseum	SK-A-4595	Arnoud van Halen
	Portrait of Jacob Heiblocq, Rector of the Latin School in Amsterdam		Rijksmuseum	SK-A-4596	Arnoud van Halen
	Portrait of Tieleman Jansz van Bracht, Clergyman and Poet in Dordrecht		Rijksmuseum	SK-A-4597	Jan Maurits Quinkhard
	Portrait of Johan de Witt, Grand Pensionary of Holland		Rijksmuseum	SK-A-4598	Jan Maurits Quinkhard
	Portrait of Matthys van de Merwede, Lord of Clootwyck, Poet in Dordrecht (Mathias de Merwede de Clootwyck)		Rijksmuseum	SK-A-4599	Arnoud van Halen
	Portrait of Franciscus Planté, Clergyman at Zevenbergen and in Brazil		Rijksmuseum	SK-A-4600	Arnoud van Halen
	Portrait of Frans Godin, Poet in Brussels		Rijksmuseum	SK-A-4602	Jan Maurits Quinkhard
	Portrait of Andries Pels (1631-81)		Rijksmuseum	SK-A-4603	Arnoud van Halen
	Portrait of Joost van Geel, Painter and Poet in Rotterdam		Rijksmuseum	SK-A-4604	Jan Maurits Quinkhard
	Portrait of Joannes Vollenhove, Clergyman and Poet in The Hague		Rijksmuseum	SK-A-4605	Arnoud van Halen
	Portrait of Christoffel Pierson (1631-1714)		Rijksmuseum	SK-A-4606	Arnoud van Halen
	Portrait of Aernout van Overbeke, Explorer and Poet		Rijksmuseum	SK-A-4607	Jan Maurits Quinkhard
	Portrait of Frans van Hoogstraten, Poet and Bookseller in Rotterdam and Dordrecht		Rijksmuseum	SK-A-4608	Arnoud van Halen
	Portrait of Petrus Schaak, Clergyman and Scholar in Amsterdam		Rijksmuseum	SK-A-4609	Jan Maurits Quinkhard
	Portrait of Karel Verloove, Poet in Amsterdam		Rijksmuseum	SK-A-4610	Arnoud van Halen
	Portrait of Pieter Verhoek (1633-1702)		Rijksmuseum	SK-A-4611	Arnoud van Halen
	Portrait of Balthasar Bekker, Clergyman and Man of Letters in Amsterdam		Rijksmuseum	SK-A-4612	Arnoud van Halen
	Portrait of David Lingelbach I, Founder of the Nieuwe Doolhof (New Labyringh), Amsterdam		Rijksmuseum	SK-A-4613	Arnoud van Halen
	Portrait of Tobias Gutberleth, Man of Letters in Leeuwarden		Rijksmuseum	SK-A-4615	Arnoud van Halen
	Portrait of Gijsbert Tijssens, Playwright in Amsterdam		Rijksmuseum	SK-A-4616	Jan Maurits Quinkhard
	Adrianus van Royen (1704-79), professor of medicine and botany in Leiden		Rijksmuseum	SK-A-4617	anonymous
	Portrait of Frans van Steenwijk, Poet and Playwright in Amsterdam		Rijksmuseum	SK-A-4618	Jan Maurits Quinkhard
	Portrait of Joannes Badon, Poet from Vlaardingen		Rijksmuseum	SK-A-4619	Nicolaas Reyers
	Portrait of Abraham Haen the Younger, Draftsman, Etcher and Poet in Amsterdam		Rijksmuseum	SK-A-4620	Jan Maurits Quinkhard
	Portrait of Lucas Pater, Merchant and Poet in Amsterdam		Rijksmuseum	SK-A-4621	Jan Maurits Quinkhard
	Portrait of Cornelis van der Pot, Merchant and Poet in Rotterdam		Rijksmuseum	SK-A-4622	Dionys van Nijmegen
	Portrait of Frans de Haes, Poet and Linguist in Rotterdam		Rijksmuseum	SK-A-4623	Dionys van Nijmegen
	Portrait of Adriaan van der Vliet, Poet in Rotterdam		Rijksmuseum	SK-A-4624	Dionys van Nijmegen
	Portrait of Nicolaas Willem op den Hooff, Physician and Translator in Amsterdam		Rijksmuseum	SK-A-4626	Jan Maurits Quinkhard
