= Elias van Nijmegen =

Dutch painter

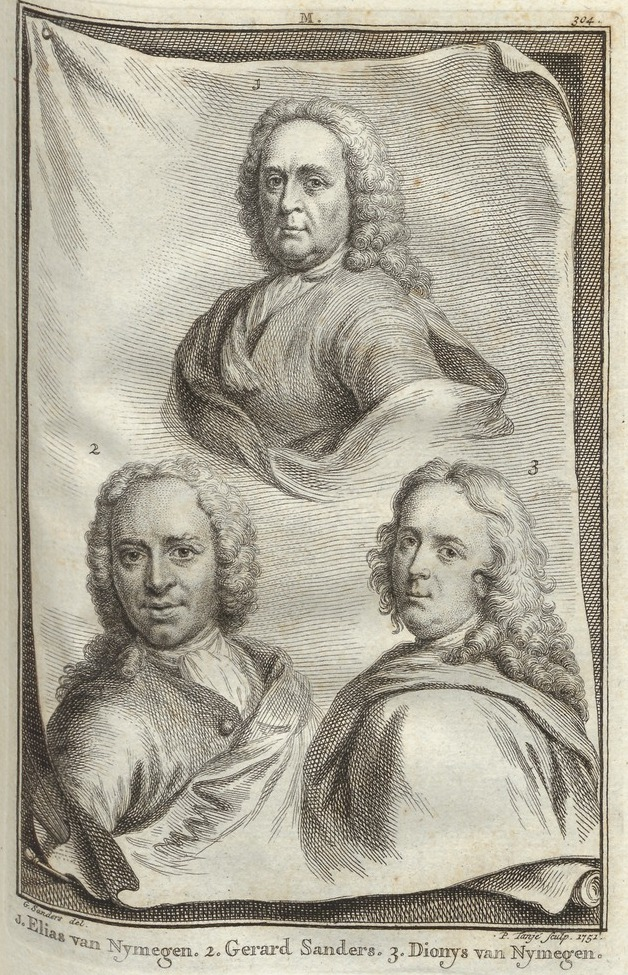
Portrait of Elias, above the engraved portraits of his pupils who were his nephew Gerard Sanders (left) and his son Dionys (right). Illustration from Jan van Gool's Nieuwe Schouburg, 1751.

Elias van Nijmegen (1667 – January 24, 1755) was an 18th-century painter from the Dutch Republic.

== Biography ==
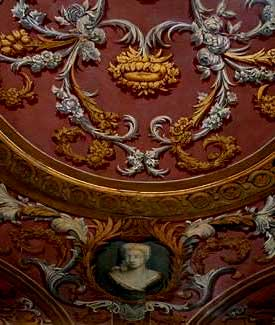
Ceiling decoration by Elias van Nijmegen, 1695, Rijksmuseum Amsterdam

He was born in Nijmegen. According to the RKD he became a member of the Leiden Guild of St. Luke in 1689, but he moved to Rotterdam where he married in 1701 and became a member of the guild there the next year in 1702. He is known for ceiling and wall decorations and was the teacher of the Rotterdam painters Gerard Sanders (his nephew by marriage of his brother Tobias to the widow Sanders) and his son Dionys. His daughter Barbara also became a painter. Van Nijmegen died in Rotterdam in 1755.
