= Govert Bidloo =

Dutch Golden Age physician, anatomist, poet and playwright

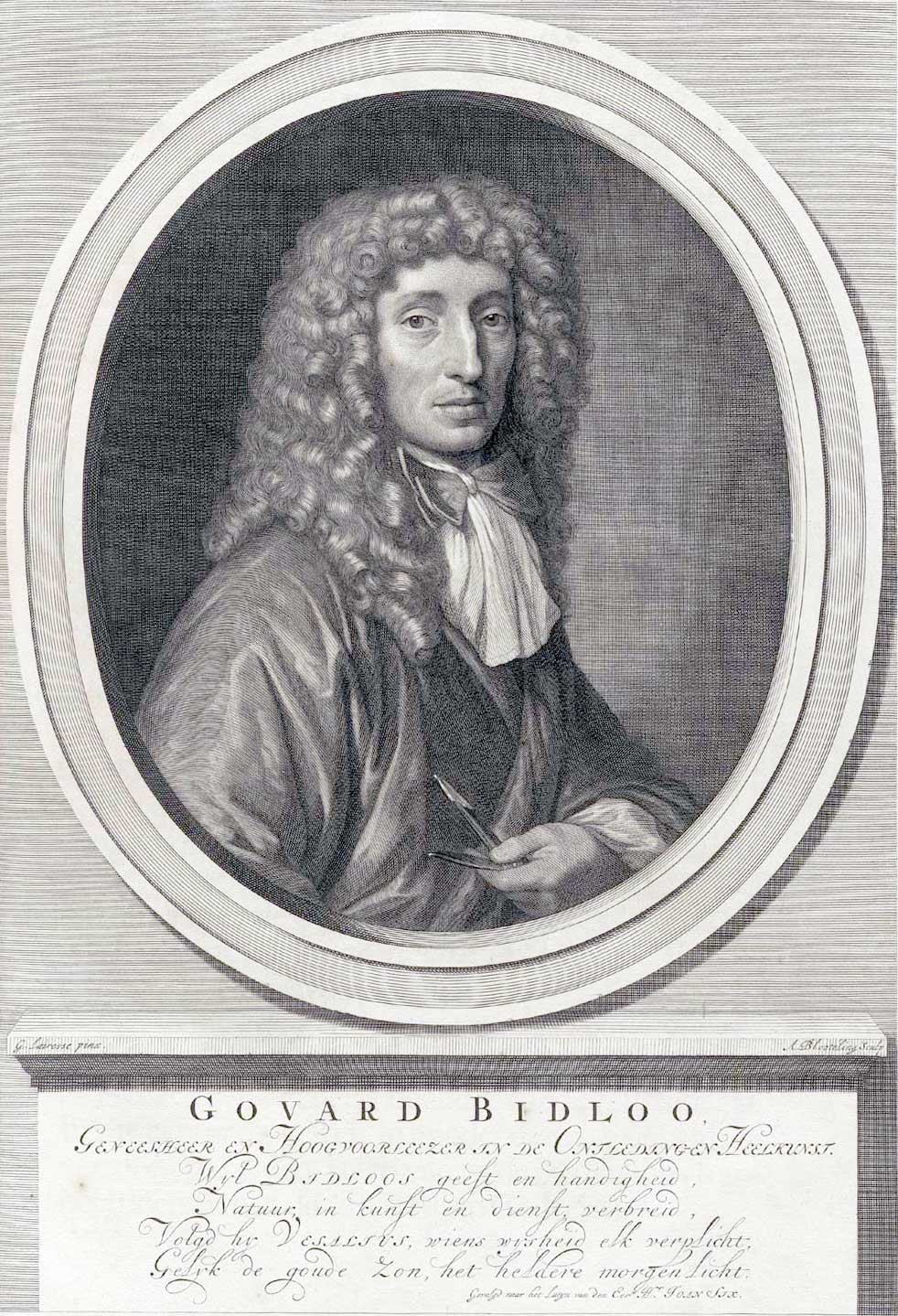
Portrait with scalpel as the new Vesalius, by Gerard de Lairesse, engraved by Abraham Blooteling, the frontispiece to his anatomical atlas.

Govert Bidloo or Govard Bidloo (12 March 1649 – 30 March 1713) was a Dutch Golden Age physician, anatomist, poet and playwright. He was the personal physician of William III of Orange-Nassau, Dutch stadholder and King of England, Scotland and Ireland.

Bidloo was also a prolific and popular poet, opera librettist, and playwright. He wrote the libretto for the first-ever Dutch opera, Bacchus, Ceres en Venus (1686) by Johan Schenck. His collected works were published in three volumes after his death.

One of Bidloo's students was his nephew Nicolaas Bidloo, who would go on to become the personal physician of Russian czar Peter the Great, and also founded a medical school in Moscow.

== Life and career ==
Born into a Mennonite family of Amsterdam, the son and namesake of a hatter, he was the younger brother of the literary apothecary, Lambert Bidloo (1638-1724), a thorough classicist who saw to it that he had a requisite mastery of Latin as well as Dutch. Govert then began his apprenticeship in surgery and in 1670 became a student of the anatomist Frederik Ruysch. He then studied medicine at the University of Franeker, receiving his degree in 1682. In 1688 he became a lecturer of anatomical dissection in The Hague, and in 1690 he was appointed head of the national hospital service, a post he also held in England from 1692. In 1694 he became a professor of anatomy and medicine at the University of Leiden, a position he held until his death in 1713, when he was succeeded by Herman Boerhaave.

== Anatomia Hvmani Corporis, 1685 ==
In 1685 he published an anatomical atlas, Anatomia Hvmani Corporis (Dutch: Ontleding des menschelyken lichaams) (1690.) Anatomia Hvmani Corporis described papillary ridges on skin (fingerprints). This was one of the pioneering scientific observations which laid the foundation of forensic identification using fingerprints. The atlas was illustrated with 105 plates by Gerard de Lairesse, showing the human figure both in living attitudes and as dissected cadavers. The book was later plagiarized by English surgeon William Cowper for his Anatomy of the Humane Bodies (1698), which gave no credit to either Bidloo or de Lairesse. This led to a number of vitriolic exchanges between Bidloo and Cowper, including several pamphlets published in each anatomist's defense. Bidloo contributed to discovery of the life cycle of the liver fluke Fasciola hepatica. He observed worms of an identical anatomy in bile ducts of sheep, calves, deer and humans. He also observed the presence of eggs inside the body of an unknown worm, later recognized as F. hepatica.

William III, Dutch stadholder and king of England, asked Bidloo to become his personal physician in 1695. The king died in his arms on 8 March 1702.

He was elected a Fellow of the Royal Society of London in 1696. He died, aged 64, in Leiden.

== Gallery ==
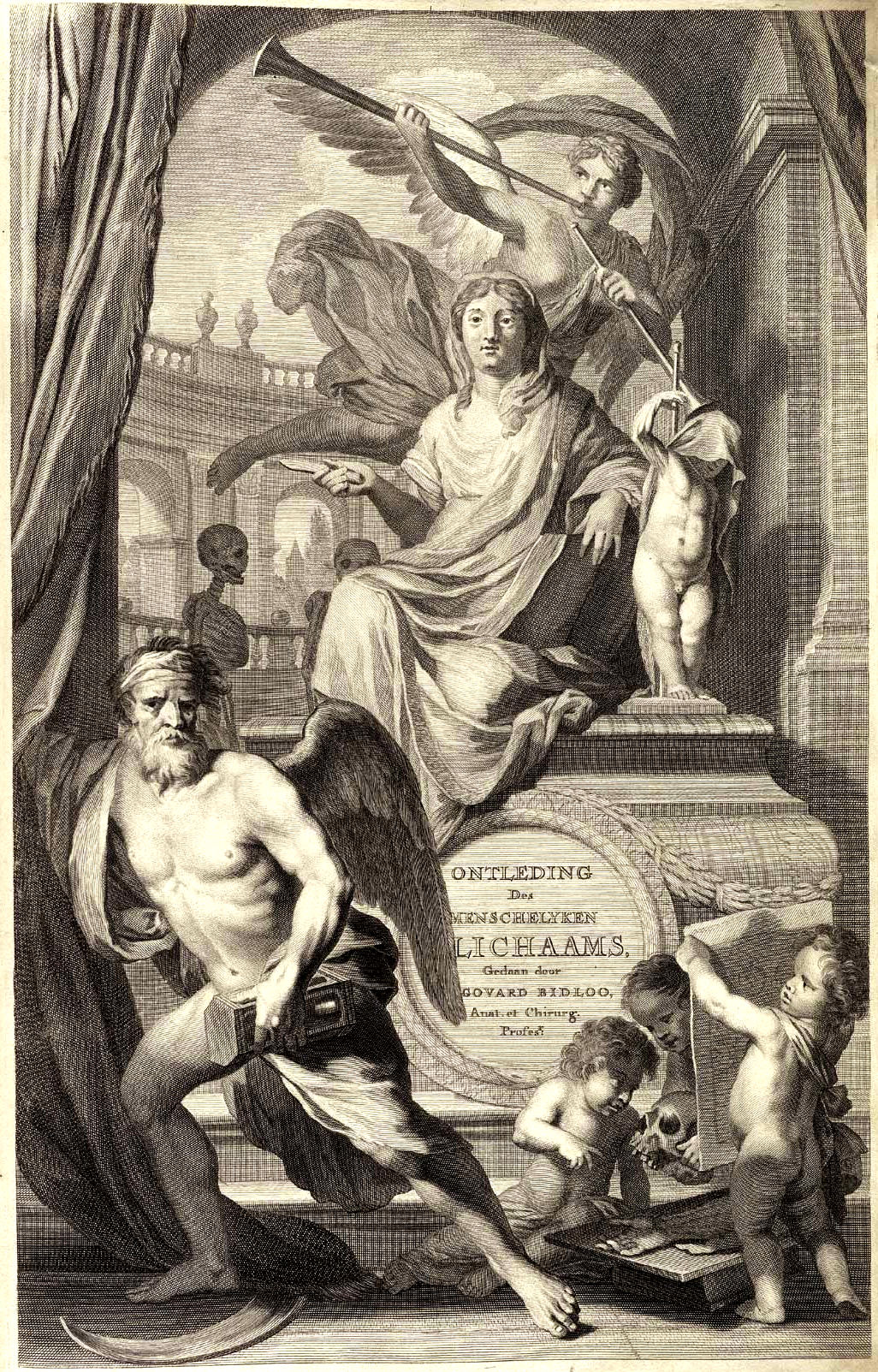

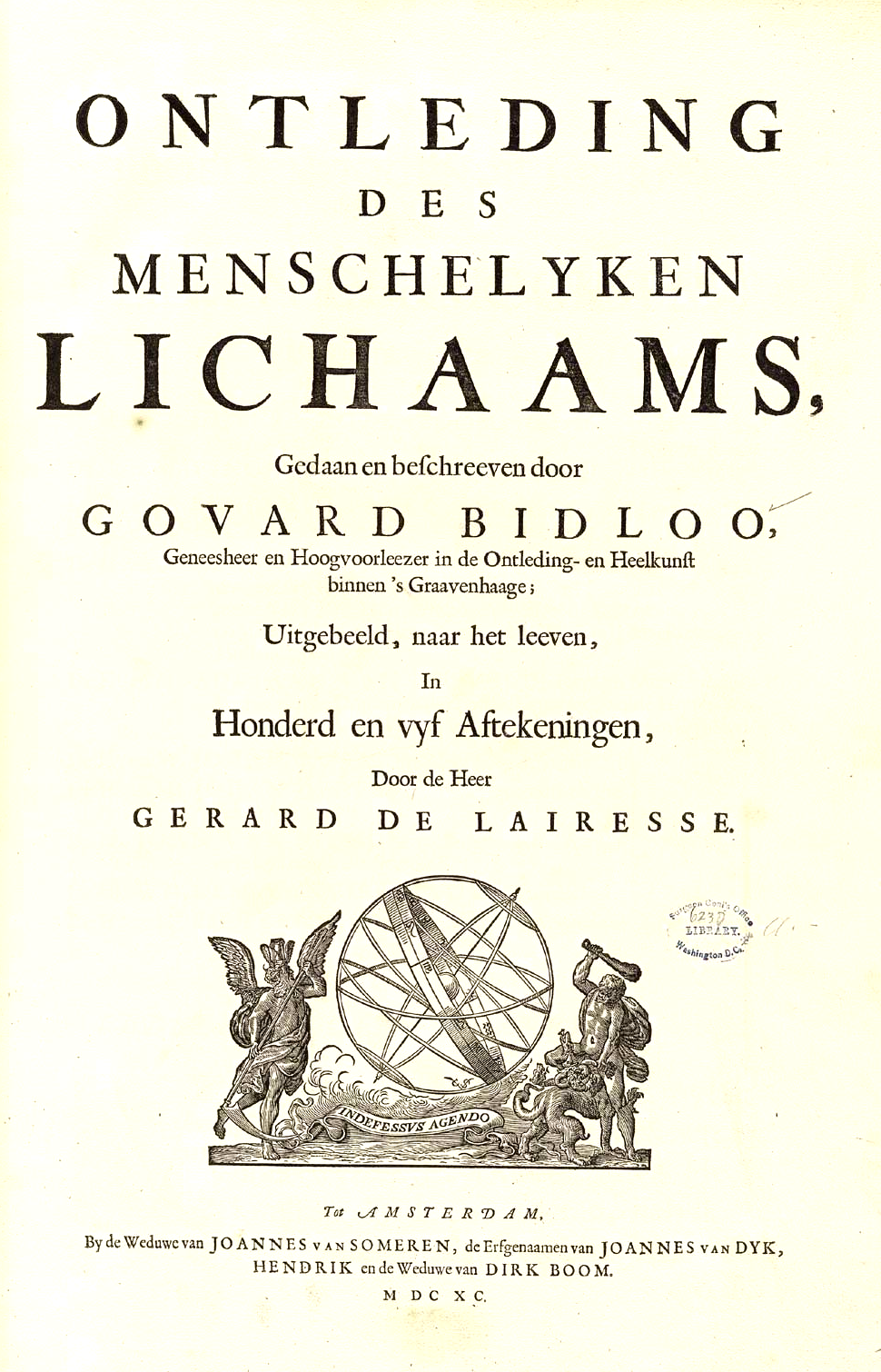

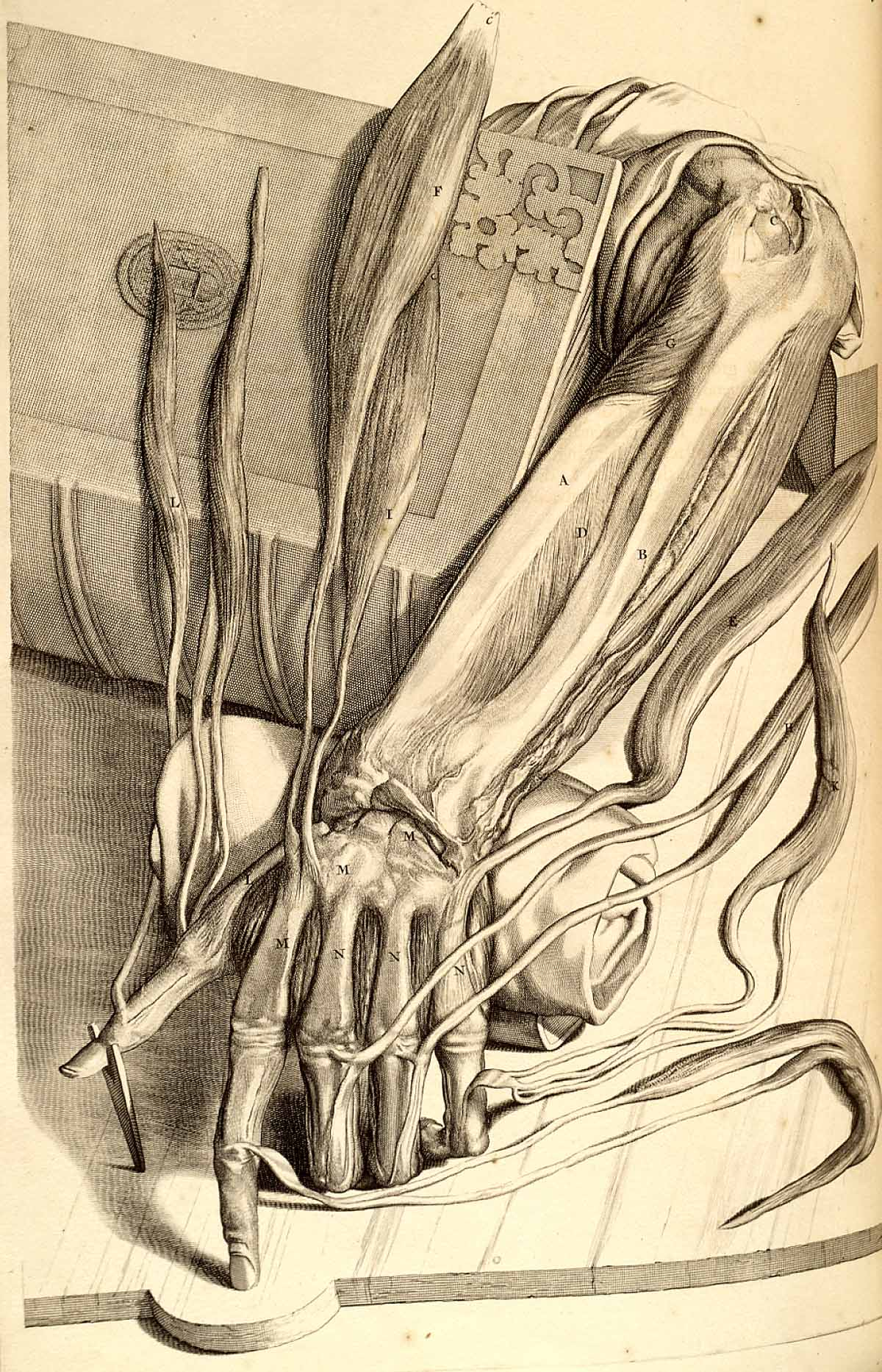

== Sources ==
- University of Glasgow
- Biographisch anthologisch en critisch woordenboek der Nederduitsche dichters (Dutch)
- Stichting Medisch en Farmaceutisch Museum De Griffioen (Dutch)
