= Dionys van Nijmegen =

Dutch painter

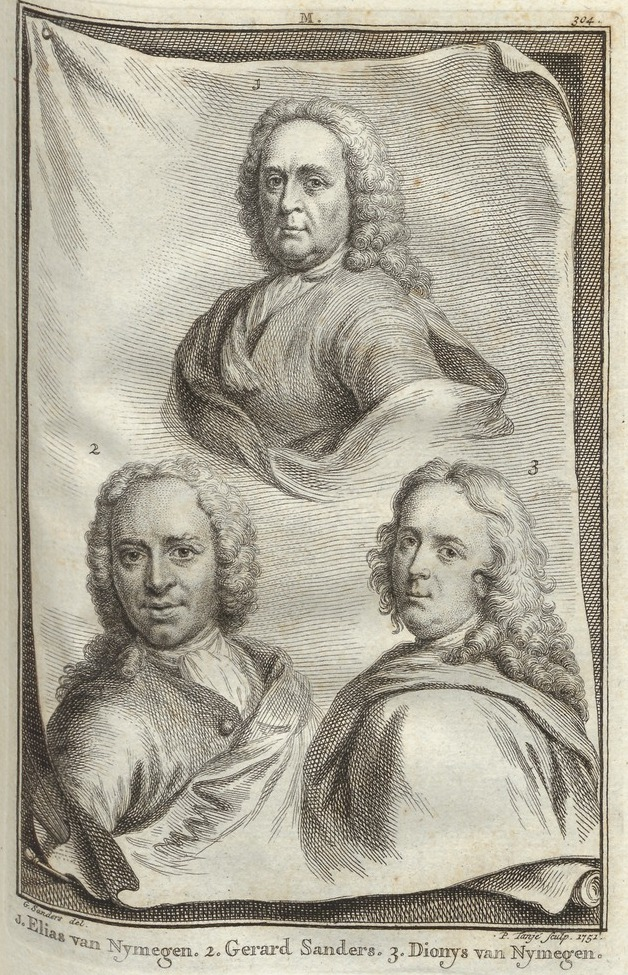
Portrait of Dionys below right, under an engraved portrait of his father Elias

Dionys van Nijmegen (1705–1798) was an 18th-century painter from the Dutch Republic.

== Biography ==
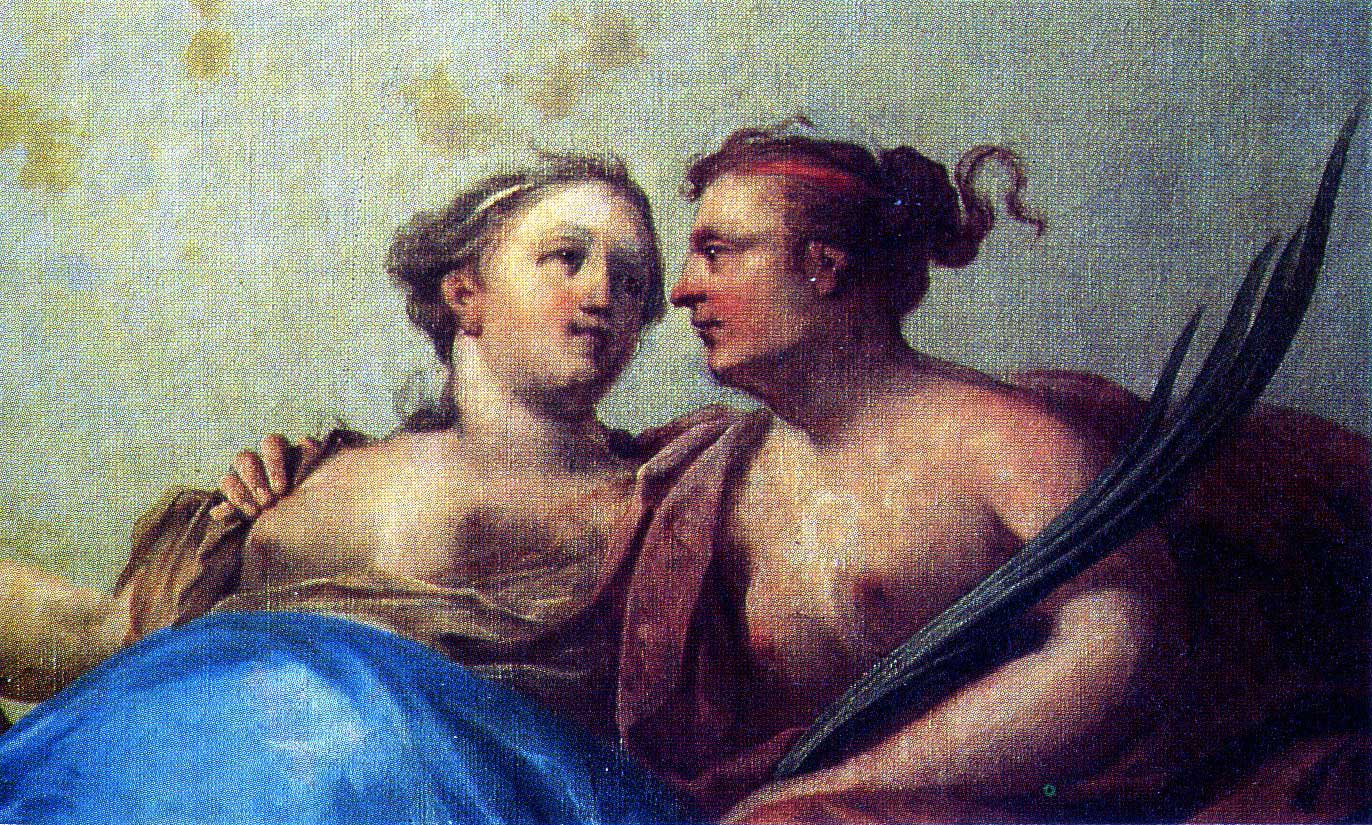
Detail of a ceiling decoration in Gouda

He was born in Rotterdam as the son of Elias van Nijmegen. He was a pupil of his father and Jacob de Wit and became a member of the Rotterdam Guild of St. Luke in 1743. He is known for portraits, wall and ceiling decorations. He was the father and teacher of Gerard van Nijmegen.

He died in Rotterdam.
