= Arnoud van Halen =

Dutch painter

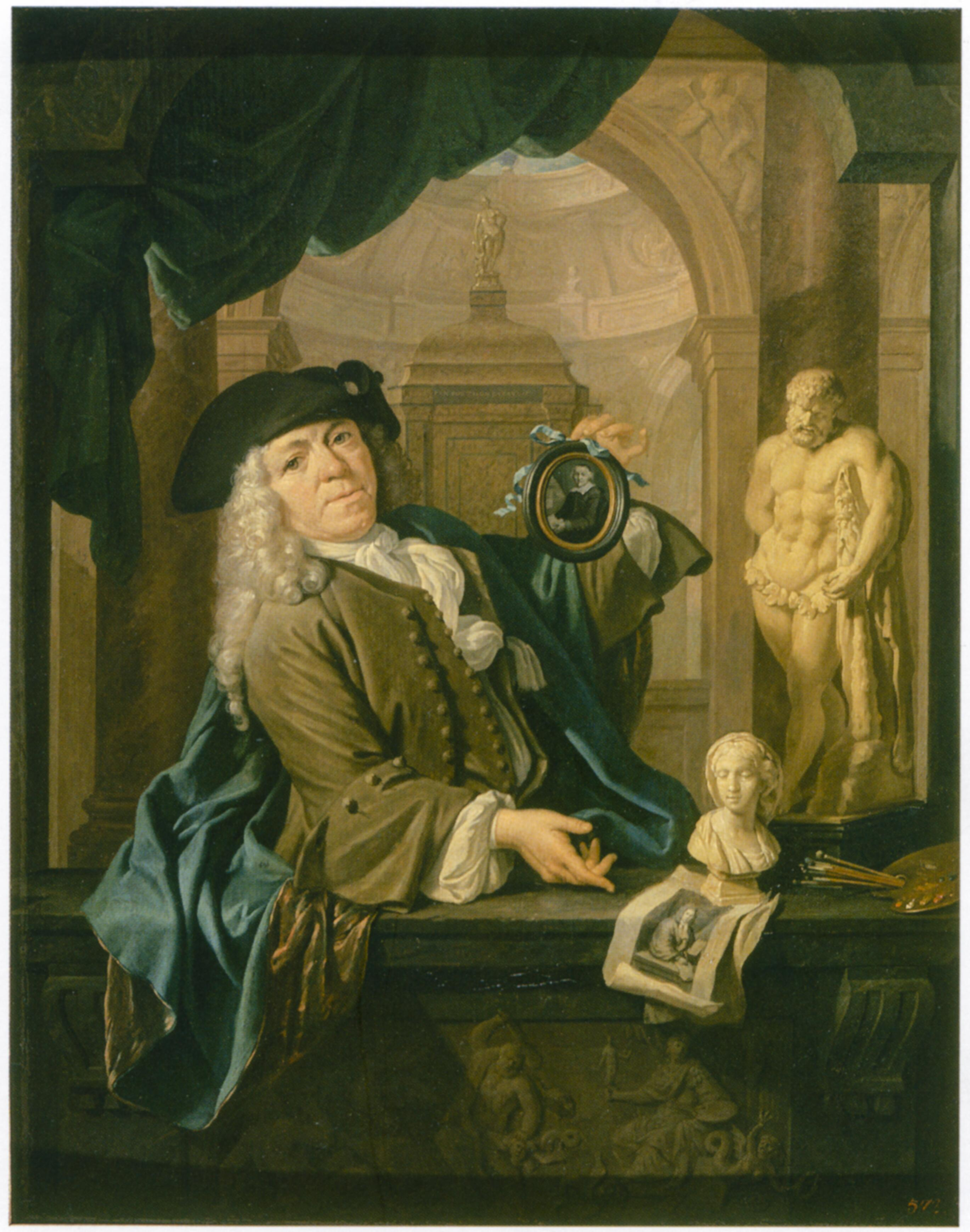
Portrait of Van Halen by Krzysztof Lubieniecki

Arnoud van Halen (1673 – 1732) was an 18th-century painter from the Dutch Republic.

== Biography ==
He was born and died in Amsterdam. According to Houbraken he painted Christoffel Pierson's portrait for his Panpoeticon Batavum (cabinet of poets), which held portraits of over 100 people by the time Houbraken was writing (1712).

According to the RKD he was also known as Arend or Aquila van Halen. He is known for portraits and engravings, also titlepages of books.
