= Love's Cruelty =

Play by James Shirley

Love's Cruelty is a Caroline-era stage play, a tragedy written by James Shirley, and first published in 1640.

The play was licensed for performance by Sir Henry Herbert, the Master of the Revels, on 14 November 1631. Like the majority of Shirley's dramas, it was acted by Queen Henrietta's Men at the Cockpit Theatre. The play was entered into the Stationers' Register on 25 April 1639 by the booksellers Andrew Crooke and William Cooke, along with three other Shirley plays. (The three were The Opportunity, The Coronation, and The Night Walker.) The play was published the next year, in a quarto printed by Thomas Cotes – though only Andrew Crooke's name is on the title page.

Shirley based his plot on material from two sources: novel 36 of the Heptaméron of Marguerite of Navarre, and novel 6, decade 3, of the Hecatomithi of Cinthio. Shirley may have accessed Marguerite's tale in English translation in The Palace of Pleasure by William Painter. Shirley's work also bears a significant resemblance to Thomas Heywood's A Woman Killed with Kindness.

Among its other features, Love's Cruelty contains a noteworthy indication of the influence of the masque on the mind of the contemporary audience. The masque – which Inigo Jones, probably its greatest artistic innovator, termed "pictures with light and motion" – was the seventeenth century's closest analogue to the modern cinema spectacular. In Shirley's play, the character Hippolito offers a contemporaneous response to the spectacles of the form:

A scene to take your eye with wonder, now to see a forest move, and the pride of summer brought into a walking wood; in the instant, as if the sea had swallowed up the earth, to see waves capering about tall ships...In the height of this rapture, a tempest so artificial and sudden in the clouds, with a general darkness and thunder, so seeming made to threaten, that you would cry out with the mariners in the work, you cannot escape drowning.

Not long after, Shirley would himself write perhaps the most successful masque of his generation in The Triumph of Peace (1634).

As a boy player, Nicholas Burt was noted for his performance as Clariana; Michael Mohun took the role of Bellamente both before and after the theatre closure of 1642–60. Love's Cruelty was revived early in the Restoration era; it was acted at the Red Bull Theatre on Thursday 15 November 1660. Samuel Pepys saw another performance of the play on 30 December 1667; he judged it "a very silly play."

== Synopsis ==
The play is set in the northern Italian city of Ferrara. Bellamente and Clariana are engaged to be married. She is interested to meet Bellamente's close and highly praised friend Hippolito. She visits him in disguise; he is called away to answer a summons from the city's Duke, and locks her in his room. Delayed longer than he expected, Hippolito sends his friend Bellamente to release the mysterious woman; Bellamente is astonished to find this fiancée, but accepts her explanation, and eventually married her. Clariana, however, commits adultery with Hippolito. They are caught by a servant, who informs Bellamente—who, after an internal debate, lets the pair off unpunished, largely to conceal his own dishonor.

The Duke of Farrara is attempting to seduce a young woman named Eubella; he employs Hippolito as his advocate. Yet Hippolito feels guilty about his betrayal of Bellamente's trust, and is charmed by Eubella's innocence and virtue; he proposes marriage to the girl. The Duke learns of this, but his own guilt leads him to bless their intended marriage. Clariana doesn't feel the same way: desirous to break up the marriage, Clariana summons Hippolito to her chamber under a false pretext on the morning of his intended wedding. Hippolito has no interest in Clariana, and rejects her attempted interference; but they are caught together, once more. Clariana stabs Hippolito, who in turn wounds her with his sword. Clariana confesses her fault to her husband, then dies; and Hippolito also dies after seeing Eubella one last time. Bellamente dies of shock; the Duke marries Eubella himself.
