= Andrew Crooke and William Cooke =

Mid-17th-century London publishers

Andrew Crooke (c. 1605 – 20 September 1674) and William Cooke (died 1641?) were London publishers of the mid-17th-century. In partnership and individually, they issued significant texts of English Renaissance drama, most notably of the plays of James Shirley.

Andrew Crooke was the son of a William Crooke, a yeoman of Kingston Blount, Oxfordshire. On 26 March 1629, Andrew Crooke won his "freedom" of the Stationers Company – that is to say, he gained full membership in the guild of London booksellers, publishers, and printers – and in time "became one of the leading publishers of his day." Perhaps his most notable solo achievements were the 1640 publication of the second edition of Ben Jonson's 1616 folio, and his editions of the Religio Medici of Sir Thomas Browne. (Of the latter, Crooke published two unauthorized editions in 1642, and the authorized and corrected edition of 1643, plus subsequent editions in 1645, 1648, 1656, 1659, 1669, and 1672). His currently best-known publication is Thomas Hobbes' scientific and political tract Leviathan.

William Cooke was a contemporary of Crooke; he began operating as a publisher in 1632. Cooke specialized in the publication of law books. Crooke tended more toward literature and general-interest works; he produced books like Sir Henry Blount's A Voyage to the Levant (1636), Richard Corbet's Certain Elegant Poems (1639), and John Bate's The Mysteries of Nature and Art (1635). Cooke's shop was near Furnival's Inn Gate in Holborn; Crooke kept his at the sign of the Green Dragon in St. Paul's Churchyard.

Each man also operated with other partners for some projects, and worked alone on others. Crooke sometimes partnered with colleague Gabriell Bedell. Cooke partnered with Matthew Walbancke for Sir Henry Spelman's De Sepultura (1641).

Yet the partnership of Crooke and Cooke earned its greatest distinction in publishing first editions of plays, particularly those of James Shirley. They issued:

- The Example, 1637
- The Gamester, 1637
- Hyde Park, 1637
- The Lady of Pleasure, 1637
- The Young Admiral, 1637
- The Duke's Mistress 1638
- The Ball, 1639
- The Tragedy of Chabot, Admiral of France, 1639
- The Coronation, 1640
- The Night Walker, 1640
- The Opportunity, 1640.

They also published John Fletcher's Wit Without Money in 1639.

In addition, Andrew Crooke issued plays apart from Cooke:

- Henry Killigrew's The Conspiracy, 1638
- Shirley's Love's Cruelty, 1640
- Robert Chamberlain's The Swaggering Damsel, 1640
- Thomas Killigrew's The Prisoners and Claricilla, 1641.

Most of the above plays were printed by Thomas Cotes, the man who printed the Shakespeare Second Folio in 1632. There was a strong professional relationship between Crooke and Cotes. (Cooke usually employed other printers for his independently published plays, cited below.)

William Cooke also published some Shirley plays on his own:

- The Bird in a Cage, 1633
- A Contention for Honor and Riches, 1633
- The Witty Fair One, 1633
- The Triumph of Peace, 1634
- The Traitor, 1635
- Love in a Maze, 1639
- The Maid's Revenge, 1639
- The Humorous Courtier, 1640 (in partnership with James Becket).

Altogether, Crooke and Cooke published almost two-thirds of Shirley's lifetime dramatic output.

Cooke disappears from the historical record after 1641; his last known work was Sir Edward Coke's The Complete Copy-Holder (1641).

Crooke issued a second edition of Wit Without Money in 1661. In 1659, Crooke partnered with stationer Henry Brome (his shop was at the sign of the Gun in Ivy Lane) to issue a volume of Richard Brome's dramas called Five New Plays; the collection contained The English Moor, The Lovesick Court, The Weeding of Covent Garden, The New Academy, and The Queen and Concubine.

Crooke maintained personal relationships with other publishers and printers: Richard Cotes, brother of Thomas Cotes, left Crooke a bequest in his 1653 last will and testament, and bookseller John Parker left Crooke a memorial ring in his 1648 will. Crooke himself left no will when he died in the autumn of 1674; administration of his estate was granted to his widow, Elizabeth (d. in or after 1696), on 15 October of that year.

Crooke had business and family connections in Dublin, the city where Shirley operated in the 1637–40 era. Crooke's nephew, another Andrew Crooke, served as "His Majesty's printer and bookseller" in Dublin from 1693 until his death in 1732. (This later Andrew Crooke, "the second," once sued his own mother, Mary Crooke, in a business dispute.) In an odd coincidence of history, Andrew Crooke II had an apprentice named William Cooke, who eventually set up shop as a printer and bookseller in Chester, where he published The Chester Weekly Journal.

== See also ==
- Robert Allot
- William Aspley
- Edward Blount
- Cuthbert Burby
- Walter Burre
- Philip Chetwinde
- Francis Constable
- Richard Field
- Richard Hawkins
- Henry Herringman
- William Jaggard
- John and Richard Marriot
- John Martyn
- Augustine Matthews
- Richard Meighen
- Humphrey Moseley
- William Ponsonby
- Humphrey Robinson
- John Smethwick
- William Stansby
- Thomas Thorpe
- Thomas Walkley
