= The Night Walker =

1640 play by John Fletcher, and later revised by James Shirley

The Night Walker, or The Little Thief is an early seventeenth-century stage play, a comedy written by John Fletcher and later revised by his younger contemporary James Shirley. It was first published in 1640.

== Authorship ==
The play enters the historical record on 11 May 1633, when it was licensed for performance by Sir Henry Herbert, the Master of the Revels. In his records, Herbert specifically describes it as "a play of Fletcher's, corrected by Shirley...." The revision is readily datable, since Shirley includes a reference to William Prynne's diatribe against the theatre, Histriomastix, which was published in 1632. Shirley even gave an inadvertent guide to the extent of his revision: he changed the name of Fletcher's protagonist from Wildgoose to Wildbrain – but neglected to make the change consistently in the portions of the play he didn't revise.

Inconsistencies in the text also reveal the revision. The most blatant example occurs in the final scene, when the Lady calls out "Home!...Home, child!" – though the scene takes place in her own house. Cyrus Hoy, in his study of authorship problems in the canon of Fletcher and his collaborators, argues for this breakdown in the play:

Fletcher – Act I, scenes 7 and 8; Act II, scene 1;
Fletcher and Shirley – Act I, scenes 1–6; Act II, scenes 2–4; Acts III, IV, and V.

Fletcher's original, which might have been titled The Little Thief, perhaps dates to 1611. Fletcher alludes to the sound of "Tom o' Lincoln," the great bell of Lincoln's Cathedral, as being like a scolding woman, as he does in his The Woman's Prize. The bell was new in 1611, and The Woman's Prize dates from that year. By implication, so did The Little Thief. Both plays also reveal the influence of Ben Jonson's Epicene (1609).

== Performance and publication ==
Shirley's revision was acted by Queen Henrietta's Men at the Cockpit Theatre in 1634. The play was revived early in the Restoration era; Samuel Pepys saw it on 2 April 1661.

The Night Walker was published in quarto in 1640, printed by Thomas Cotes for the booksellers Andrew Crooke and William Cooke; the title page assigns it to Fletcher alone, and does the dedication. Andrew Crooke issued a second quarto edition in 1661. The play was included in the second Beaumont and Fletcher folio of 1679.

A production of "The Night Walker", directed by Emily Bassett, was performed by Mary Baldwin University's Shakespeare & Performance Graduate Program in February, 2025.

== Synopsis ==
The plot of the play focuses on an arranged marriage. The heroine, Maria, is in love with a suitable potential mate, Frank Heartlove; but her mother (known only as the Lady) coerces Maria into a marriage with a rich old miser, Justice Algrip. Maria's Nurse describes him as "this old stinking dog's flesh," among other choice epithets. At the marriage feast, Maria's cousin, the prankster Jack Wildbrain, urges the heartbroken and rejected Heartlove to attempt to cuckold the Justice on his wedding night, and arranges Heartlove's opportunity to be with Maria alone. But Maria, a virtuous young woman, resists Heartlove's advances, even drawing a dagger and threatening to harm herself if he persists. Unfortunately, they are caught together by the Justice and other members of the wedding party; Maria, her reputation ruined, falls into a swoon, and is perceived to be dead.

Meanwhile, Wildbrain's friend Tom Lurcher, a down-and-out gentleman turned thief, is recruiting a new apprentice in thievery, a boy who calls himself Snap (he is the "little thief"). Lurcher's modus operandi involves disguise and trickery: it's easier to burgle a house when the inhabitants are terrified of devils. Lurcher and the boy break into the Lady's house, to make off with the chest that holds the wedding gifts; instead they steal the coffin containing Maria's body. When they discover their error, they take the coffin out to bury it; but they encounter Justice Algrip, on his way home from the Lady's house. The boy pretends to be Maria's ghost to frighten him off. In so doing, the boy mentions a woman the Justice abandoned in order to marry Maria – a broad hint that Snap is more than he appears to be. No sooner is he gone, though, that Maria wakes from her swoon, and the thieves flee the scene.

The Lady drives Jack Wildbrain from her doors, blaming him for the wedding disaster and even for the disappearance of the coffin. Wandering in the night, Wildbrain meets a dejected Heartlove, who now blames Wildbrain for getting him drunk and manipulating him into his disgraceful conduct earlier. Heartlove challenges Wildbrain to a duel. As they fight, a disoriented Maria stumbles upon them; she pretends to be her own ghost to frighten and shock them out of the duel. Afterward her Nurse takes her in, under the disguise of a Welsh cousin; the Lady soon penetrates the guise, but agrees to maintain it till Maria's reputation can be restored.

Lurcher and the boy, under various disguises, fool and rob the Justice, and then waylay and drug him; when the Justice wakes, he is confronted with "furies" and "hellhounds" ready to drag him to Hell for his sins. His soul is saved, however, when an angel (the boy in costume) intervenes; Justice Algrip repents his past misdeeds and promises to make amends. The Justice keeps his word: he returns Maria's dowry and admits that his precontract with another woman makes his marriage to Maria null and void. He also yields up the mortgage he holds on Lurcher's property, thus restoring Lurcher's fortunes. Maria is revealed and restored to Heartlove; and the boy thief turns out to be Lurcher's sister, and the woman to whom the Justice was previously committed. She has manipulated Lurcher to keep his bad deeds under control; it was her doing that they stole the coffin instead of the wedding treasure. And she accepts the Justice as her intended husband once again..."old dry ham of horse flesh" though he may be. Even Wildbrain is restored to the Lady's good graces.
