= The Humorous Courtier =

Play by James Shirley

The Humorous Courtier, also called The Duke, is a Caroline era stage play, a comedy written by James Shirley, first published in 1640.

The Humorous Courtier was licensed for performance by Sir Henry Herbert, the Master of the Revels, on 17 May 1631, under the title The Duke. Like most of Shirley's plays, it was acted by Queen Henrietta's Men at the Cockpit Theatre. As The Humorous Courtier, the play was entered into the Stationers' Register on 29 July 1639. The 1640 quarto, printed by Thomas Cotes for the bookseller William Cooke, contains an interesting bibliographic feature in its prefatory material: a catalogue of 20 plays by Shirley published to that date. Such catalogues were only then coming into existence. (Since Cooke had already published a number of Shirley's plays, this promotional catalogue served his own interest.)

As its title indicates, the play is a humors comedy. That subgenre was initiated by George Chapman with his An Humorous Day's Mirth (1597), but is most strongly associated with Ben Jonson, whose plays Every Man in His Humour and Every Man Out of His Humour defined the form. Later writers also worked in the humors vein, as John Fletcher did in his tragicomedy The Humorous Lieutenant (c. 1619). As the Duchess of Mantua says of her courtiers, "They are mad humours, and I must physic them."

== Synopsis ==
The Duke of Parma, Foscari, has been plying his marriage suit to the Duchess of Mantua—but he suddenly disappears from her court. The Duchess announces that she intends to select a husband from her own courtiers. Egged on by her new favorite Giotto and her lady in waiting Laura, each lord flatters himself that he is the favored candidate. Depazzi practices his eloquence with rehearsed speeches, while Volterre prides himself on his command of foreign languages. Contarini, a married man, actually tries to convince his wife to kill herself to leave him single again; when she naturally declines, he attempts to bribe Giotto into committing adultery with her so that a divorce can result. The misogynistic Orseolo portrays himself as a great lover; the elderly Comachio joins his compatriots in making a fool of himself. In the end, the Duchess gently mocks and reproves her eccentric courtiers, and announces that she will marry Giotto—who turns out to be the Duke of Parma in disguise.
