= The Lady of Pleasure =

Comedy of manners by James Shirley

The Lady of Pleasure is a Caroline era comedy of manners written by James Shirley, first published in 1637. It has often been cited as among the best, and sometimes as the single best, the "most brilliant," of the dramatist's comic works.

== Date and performance ==
The play was licensed for performance by Sir Henry Herbert, the Master of the Revels, on 15 October 1635. It was performed by Queen Henrietta's Men at the Cockpit Theatre in Drury Lane, in the final winter before the theatres suffered a long closure due to bubonic plague (May 1636 to October 1637) and Shirley himself left London for Dublin (1637).

== Publication ==
The 1637 quarto was printed by Thomas Cotes for the booksellers Andrew Crooke and William Cooke. This first edition may throw some light on the publication of Shirley's works in the late 1630s and after. Scholarly opinion has been divided as to the degree to which Shirley was or wasn't involved in the publication of his plays. One body of opinion holds that the Queen Henrietta's company sold off their stock of Shirley's plays to the stationers during the difficult months of the 1636–37 theatre closure, after Shirley had left for Ireland. (Five of his plays were published in 1637 alone, and four more by the end of 1639.) Upon his return to London in 1640, Shirley was so annoyed by this that he would no longer write for the company, but switched to the King's Men for his final plays, before the theatres closed in 1642 with the start of the English Civil War.

In this context, note that the 1637 quarto was dedicated to Richard Lovelace, who had been created Baron Lovelace of Hurley in 1627. But Richard Lovelace had died in April 1634; his son and successor was named John. This sloppiness is more suggestive of the tradesmen booksellers than of Shirley the Court sophisticate.

== Critical response ==
Those who admire or enjoy Shirley's work can specify The Lady of Pleasure as displaying his "ornate and profuse fancy to the greatest advantage." But critics with serious moral and ethical preoccupations tend to be uncomfortable with the poet's portraits of amorality and immorality, and judge his plays more stringently. The Lady of Pleasure was singled out by C. S. Lewis, in his Rehabilitations and Other Essays (1939), as representative of Shirley's comedies — to which Lewis gives a firmly negative evaluation. The play has also been studied as "a commentary on the Platonic love cult in the Caroline court under Queen Henrietta Maria."

== Synopsis ==
The play is structured in the three-level plot format that Shirley exploits for other comedies, like Hyde Park and The Ball. The main plot concerns the married couple of Sir Thomas and Lady Bornwell. Here, Shirley rings a significant change on the formulas of English Renaissance comedy: Lady Bornwell is a philandering female, the "lady of pleasure" of the play's title, while Sir Thomas's goal is to reform his wife's conduct. Aretina is devoted to the pastimes and vices of courtly aristocrats, notably in spending her husband's money. Sir Thomas tries to frighten his wife into restraint by pretending to pursue Celestina, a sixteen-year-old widow. His strategy fails at first. Yet Aretina is brought up short by the prospect of actual bankruptcy, and by the shock of learning that her partner in a casual tryst in the dark does not know her name and thinks she's a succubus, a "she-devil."

The second-level plot involves Celestina's attempts to reform the otherwise-unnamed Lord A from his perceived misogyny. Here again, the play departs from the standard pattern, in that the heroine of the second-level plot is presented as more admirable and morally serious than the female character on the first level. (Their contrasting names are clues to meaning: Celestina is "heavenly," while Aretina is a female form of Aretino, the Italian pornographer.) Celestina, is can be noted, is not an ascetic or a prig; she herself pursues pleasure, but in a moderate way that is in keeping with the mores of her society and class. Aretina is to be faulted, and needs to be reformed, because she goes too far.

The play also has a more purely comic third-level plot, involving the character Master Frederick, who descends from scholarship to drunkenness; and it contains the comic features typical of Shirleian comedy, like the clownish suitors Littleworth and Kickshaw (a "kickshaw" is a trinket, a flashy object of little intrinsic value), plus Madame Decoy the bawd, Sir William Scentlove the worthless dandy, and Haircut the barber.

Aphra Behn would later borrow plot elements from Shirley's play for her own The Lucky Chance (1686).
