= Wit Without Money =

1639 play by John Fletcher

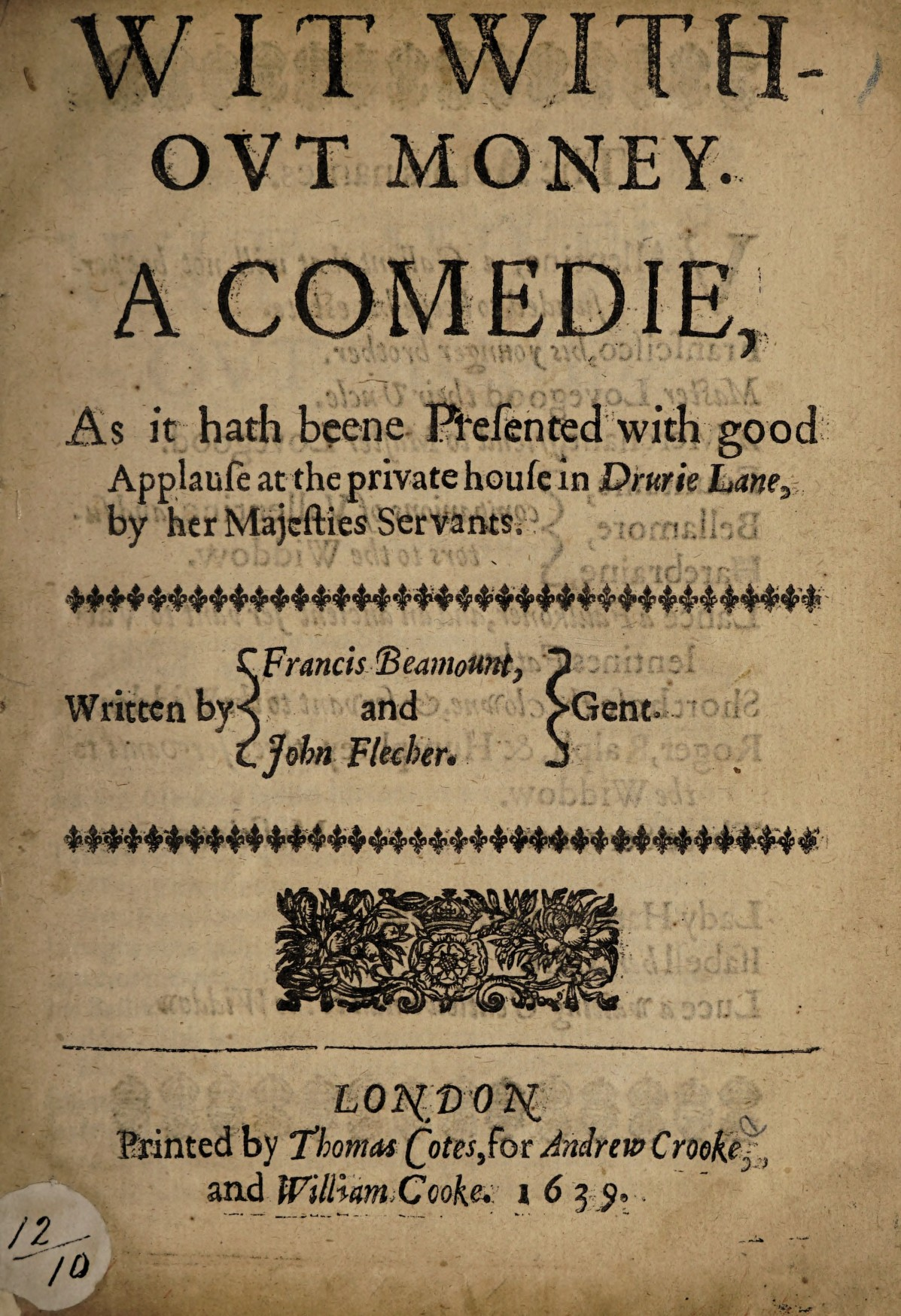
Title page of the first edition of Wit Without Money (1639), printed by Thomas Cotes

Wit Without Money is a Jacobean era stage play, a comedy written by John Fletcher, and first published in 1639.

== Date and authorship ==
Scholars have dated the play to c. 1614, based on allusions to contemporary events – notably the opening of the New River in 1613 and reports of a "monstrous serpent or dragon" in Sussex in August 1614. The early editions of the play assign it to Beaumont and Fletcher, but scholars who have studied the play since the nineteenth century agree that Beaumont is absent from the work; "All investigators are agreed in giving the play to Fletcher" alone. Some critics, however, have argued that the text was revised, perhaps around 1620, a light revision which nonetheless removed Fletcher's characteristic preference for ye as against you. Written mostly in prose instead of verse, Wit Without Money resembles another Fletcher comedy, The Elder Brother.

== Performance and publication ==
The play may originally have been written for Lady Elizabeth's Men. By the 1630s it was part of the repertoire of the Cockpit Theatre, where it was performed by both Queen Henrietta's Men and Beeston's Boys. It was entered into the Stationers' Register on 25 April 1639 and was published later that year in a quarto printed by Thomas Cotes for the booksellers Andrew Crooke and William Cooke. Crooke issued a second edition in 1661. The title pages of both quartos attribute the work to Beaumont and Fletcher together, and it was included in the second Beaumont and Fletcher folio of 1679.

Wit Without Money is one of the few plays known to have been performed during the English Civil War and the Interregnum period (1642–1660), when the London theatres were formally closed but operated when they could. The play was staged at the Red Bull Theatre on 3 February 1648; unable to sell tickets openly, the actors had tickets thrown into the gentry's coaches. Another performance, on 29 December 1654, was broken up by the authorities.

Like many of Fletcher's works, the play was revived during the Restoration era, and was performed at the Middle Temple in 1660. A production at the King's Playhouse in London on 22 April 1663 was "not enjoyed much" by Samuel Pepys. John Dryden wrote a Prologue for a 1672 revival. When the King's Company's Theatre Royal, Drury Lane burned down in January 1672, the production was moved to the theatre at Lincoln's Inn Fields and debuted there on 26 February 1672. The play was adapted to meet changing tastes; a version "with alterations and amendments" was printed in an undated edition that probably appeared in 1707 or 1708. In fact the play seems to have been more popular in the 18th century than it was during the Restoration period, being regularly performed through the 1760s and as late as 1782.

== Synopsis ==
Valentine is a young gentleman who has wasted his estate; in what seems overt and willful irresponsibility, he has mortgaged his lands to live the life of a fashionable man about town. His Uncle tries to persuade him to behave more responsibly, to do something to repair his fortunes – even to the extreme of marrying a wealthy woman; but Valentine will not listen. Valentine has not only imperiled his own future, but has squandered the resources that provided an annuity to his younger brother Francisco.

Valentine has fallen in with a trio of suitors, Fountain, Bellamore, and Hairbrain, who court the wealthy widow Lady Hartwell; but Valentine refuses to follow their examples, much to his Uncle's displeasure. Instead, Valentine uses his considerable wit and verbosity to slander widows, marriage, and women in general. Lady Hartwell's younger sister Isabella happens to catch sight of Francisco, and instantly falls in love with him. Her maid Luce informs Lady Hartwell of Isabella's infatuation; and the Lady, unhappy at the poor prospect of Francisco as a brother-in-law, decides to prevent a match between them by packing up her household and leaving London for her country estate. Her plan is delayed when Valentine gets her coachman too drunk to drive. This provokes a confrontation between Valentine and Lady Hartwell; he employs his usual slanders and screeds against her, but is astonished when she stands her ground and equals him, indeed betters him, in a battle of words and wits. Afterward, it is clear that the Lady is interested in the provoking gentleman.

Isabella sends a purse full of coin to Francisco, anonymously, through her sister's follower Shorthose; but the young man tracks down the source and seeks her out to thank her in person. She, however, is too proud and shy to acknowledge her feelings openly. It is only when Francisco confronts her by surprise on her way to church that they reach an understanding. Valentine and Lady Hartwell have a similar problem. Valentine's Uncle tries to force them past their standstill: he congratulates the Lady on her marriage to his nephew, and even suggests that she is already pregnant by him. Lady Hartwell goes to Valentine to confront him about this; from arguing they fall to flirting, then courting, and finally agree to marry. By the play's end, both pairs, the two brothers and the sisters, are joined.

== Sources ==
- Chambers, E. K. The Elizabethan Stage. 4 Volumes, Oxford, Clarendon Press, 1923.
- Griswold, Wendy. Renaissance Revivals: City Comedy and Revenge Tragedy in the London Theatre, 1576–1980. Chicago, University of Chicago Press, 1986.
- Leech, Clifford. The John Fletcher Plays. London, Chatto & Windus, 1962.
- Logan, Terence P., and Denzell S. Smith, eds. The Later Jacobean and Caroline Dramatists: A Survey and Bibliography of Recent Studies in English Renaissance Drama. Lincoln, NE, University of Nebraska Press, 1978.
- MacMullan, Gordon. The Politics of Unease in the Plays of John Fletcher. Amherst, MA, University of Massachusetts Press, 1994.
- Maxwell, Baldwin. Studies in Beaumont, Fletcher, and Massinger. Chapel Hill, NC, University of North Carolina Press, 1939.
- Oliphant, E. H. C. The Plays of Beaumont and Fletcher: An Attempt to Determine Their Respective Shares and the Shares of Others. New Haven, Yale University Press, 1927.
- Potter, Alfred Claghorn. A Bibliography of Beaumont and Fletcher. Cambridge, MA, Library of Harvard University, 1890.
- Sprague, Arthur Colby. Beaumont and Fletcher on the Restoration Stage. Cambridge, MA, Harvard University Press, 1926.
