= The Young Admiral =

Play by James Shirley

The Young Admiral is a Caroline era tragicomedy written by James Shirley, and first published in 1637. It has often been considered Shirley's best tragicomedy, and one of his best plays.

The play was licensed for performance by Sir Henry Herbert, the Master of the Revels, on 3 July, 1633. In licensing the play, Herbert took the opportunity to record his "delight and satisfaction" with it, and held it up as "a pattern to other poets...for the bettering of manners and language...." The play was acted by Queen Henrietta's Men at the Cockpit Theatre, and was performed at St. James's Palace on Tuesday, 19 November 1633, in honor of the birthday of King Charles I. (A generation later, his son and eventual successor Charles II would watch a revival of the play on 20 November 1662.) The play's subject was topical in 1633: Charles was considering filling the post of Lord High Admiral of England, which had been vacant since the 1628 assassination of George Villiers, 1st Duke of Buckingham.

The Young Admiral was one of five of Shirley's plays published in 1637. The play was entered into the Stationers' Register on 13 April 1637, and was issued later that year in a quarto printed by Thomas Cotes for the booksellers Andrew Crooke and William Cooke. Shirley dedicated the play to George Harding, 8th Baron Berkeley, a prominent literary patron of the day.

Shirley's source for the plot of his play was Don Lope de Cardona, by Lope de Vega. Shirley tightens the Aristotelian unities of the plot, and simplifies the story by eliminating some of the more fantastic elements of Lope's story – Vittori doesn't go mad, Cassandra doesn't dress as a man; she also doesn't apparently die and is not apparently resurrected. It is a rare case in which Shirley's drama can be praised for restraint.

== Synopsis ==
The play tells the story of Vittori, admiral to Cesario, prince of Naples. Both Vittori and Cesario are competitors for the hand of Cassandra; on her account Cesario breaks off his intended marriage with Rosinda, princess of Sicily. In response to this insult, the Sicilians attack Naples. Cesario sends Vittori to command his fleet in defense, hoping his admiral will be killed – but Vittori is, as his name suggests, victorious. The Admiral, however, finds that the city gates are closed to him on his return, and that his prince is conspiring against him. Vittori flees with his father and Cassandra; but the father, Alphonso, is captured by the Neapolitans, while Vittori and Cassandra are shipwrecked and captured by the Sicilian forces. The King of Sicily, preparing to lay siege Naples, threatens to kill Cassandra if Vittori does not join his forces; and Vittori agrees. Yet he learns that his father will be beheaded if he keeps to his bargain with the King; the choice between the lives of his father and his love is a typical tragicomic dilemma.

Cesario, however, is drawn to the Sicilian camp by a letter from Cassandra, and there he too is captured. The Sicilian princess Rosinda counters by surrendering to the Neapolitans, which forces the arrangement of a peace treaty. Vittori and Cassandra marry, as do Cesario and Rosinda.

The play's mandatory comic subplot features Rosinda's cowardly servant Pazzorello.
