= Hyde Park (play) =

1637 play by James Shirley

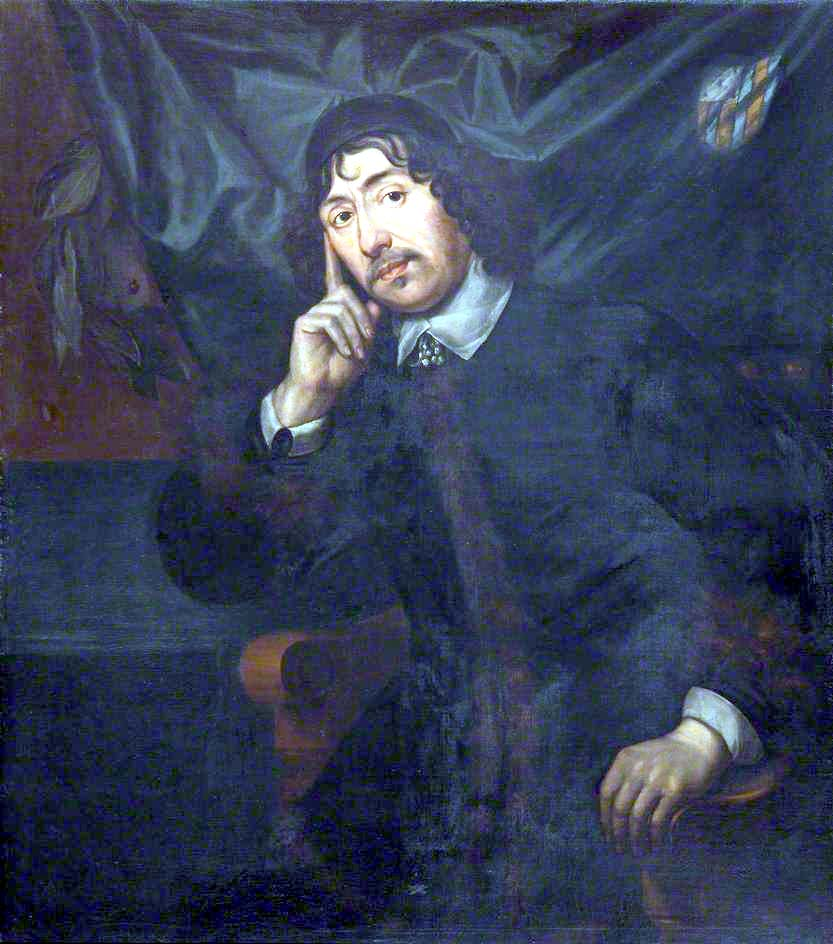
Portrait of Shirley

Hyde Park is a Caroline era comedy of manners written by James Shirley, and first published in 1637.

Hyde Park was licensed for performance by Sir Henry Herbert, the Master of the Revels, on 20 April 1632, and acted at the Cockpit Theatre by Queen Henrietta's Men. The play was entered into the Stationers' Register on 13 April 1637, and published later that year by the bookselling partners Andrew Crooke and William Cooke, who issued several of Shirley's works in this period.

Hyde Park was revived during the Restoration era – in a production that featured live horses for the horse-racing material. Samuel Pepys saw it on 11 July 1668, but didn't like it. Three days later, though, the play was given a royal performance.

== Place realism ==
The play has been noted for the element of naturalism in its setting. Hyde Park exploits the atmosphere of the real contemporaneous Hyde Park, with horse races and footraces. Games and gambling are the constant themes and motifs of the play; the characters envision and describe their relationships in terms of competition and gamesmanship. The Park's nightingales accentuate the romantic plots. Upon publication Shirley dedicated the play to Henry Rich, 1st Earl of Holland, who was the Keeper of the Crown Land of Hyde Park, as well as a member of the Privy Council and a Knight of the Garter.

Dramas utilizing "place realism" came into fashion in the early 1630s, partially in response to the 1631 publication of Ben Jonson's Bartholomew Fair. Shackerley Marmion's Holland's Leaguer (1631), Thomas Nabbes's Covent Garden (1633) and Tottenham Court (1634), and several of the plays of Richard Brome all participate in this theatrical fashion.

== Synopsis ==
Hyde Park utilizes the triple-plot structure employed in many plays of the era – a structure that Shirley develops through a number of his plays, most notably in comedies like The Ball and The Lady of Pleasure. The main plot features the romance of Fairfield and Carol. Fairfield regards Carol as being "too cruel" in her attitude toward men; he maneuvers her into a commitment "never to desire my company "— as a paradoxical way of winning her. The two engage in a back-and-forth battle of wills and wits, a contest of mutual manipulation, each seeking the upper hand against each other in a series of encounters (Act I, scene ii; II,iv; III,ii; and V,i). In the end, they call their contest a tie and come to terms.

In the second-level plot, Trier engages in one of those all-too-foolish tests of love and faith that feature so often in plays of the English Renaissance: he has Julietta entertain Lord Bonville to try her loyalty...only to lose her instead. Bonville the rake and seducer is converted into a serious love partner by Julietta's honorable conduct (II,iii; III,i; and V,i).

And in the broad and farcical comic subplot, Mistress Bonavent made an agreement with her husband before he left for the sea: she would be free to marry again if he does not return in seven years. On the day the seven-year commitment expires, she marries a new love, Lacy – but on the same day Bonavent, with the good timing suggested by his name, returns, to reclaim his wife before her new marriage is consummated (II,ii; IV,iii). The play is rounded out with the usual (for Shirley) comic support, notably the clownish suitors Venture and Rider.

== Performances ==
A rare modern performance of the play was staged in 1987 by the RSC at the Swan Theatre, Stratford upon Avon, and later at the Barbican, London. It starred Fiona Shaw, Alex Jennings and John Carlisle, and was directed by Barry Kyle.

A staged reading of the play took place at Shakespeare's Globe Education Centre, London during 2004.

In June 2016, the Department of Theatre, Film and Television at the University of York staged a production directed by Michael Cordner. The performance was broadcast live on 10 June 2016.
