= 1579 in literature =

This article presents lists of the literary events and publications in 1579.

== Events ==
- January 28 – Burmese language poets Nawrahta Minsaw and Hsinbyushin Medaw become king and queen consort of Lanna respectively.
- February – Torquato Tasso arrives in Ferrara. Shortly afterwards he is confined in the Ospedale di Sant'Anna as insane; he remains here until 1586.
- unknown dates – Bible of Kralice begins publication. The first complete translation of the Bible into the Czech language (with notes) is prepared by the Unity of the Brethren and published at Kralice nad Oslavou in Bohemia.

== New books ==
- John Frampton
  - A discourse of the Navigation which the Portugales doe Make to the Realmes and Provinces of the East Partes of the Worlde, and of the knowledge that growes by them of the great thinges, which are in the Dominion of China, first English work (translated from Bernardino de Escalante) devoted to China
  - The most noble and famous travels of Marco Polo, first English translation of The Travels of Marco Polo
- Stephen Gosson – The Schoole of Abuse, containing a pleasant invective against Poets, Pipers, Plaiers, Jesters and such like Caterpillars of the Commonwealth
- Martin de Hoyarçabal – Les voyages aventureux du Capitaine Martin de Hoyarsal, habitant du çubiburu
- Thomas Lodge – Honest Excuses
- Thomas North – The Lives of the Noble Grecians and Romanes (Plutarch's Parallel Lives translated from Amyot's French version)
- Piotr Skarga – Żywoty świętych (Lives of the Saints)
- Johann Weyer - Histoire Disputes et Discours des Illusions et Diables, des Magiciens Infame, Sorcieres et Empoisonneurs: des Ensorcelez et Demoniaques et de la Guerison D'Iceux: Item de la Punition que Meritent les Magiciens les Empoisonneurs et les Sorcieres
- Christian Wurstisen - Elementa arithmeticae, logicis legibus deducta in usum Academiae Basiliensis. Opera et studio Christiani Urstisii.

== Poetry ==
- Edmund Spenser (anonymously) – The Shepheardes Calender

== Births ==
- February 9 – Johannes Meursius, Dutch classical scholar (died 1639)
- August 1 – Luís Vélez de Guevara, Spanish dramatist and novelist (died 1644)
- August 23 – Thomas Dempster, Scottish Catholic scholar and historian (died 1625)
- September 16 – Samuel Coster, Dutch dramatist (died 1665)
- October 4 – Guido Bentivoglio, Italian statesman and historian (died 1644)
- December 20 (baptised) – John Fletcher, English dramatist (died 1625)
- Unknown dates
  - Chimalpahin, Aztec historian (died 1660)
  - Arthur Johnston, Scottish poet and physician (died 1641)
  - Johannes Messenius, Swedish historian and dramatist (died 1636)
  - Rhys Prichard, Welsh-language religious poet (died 1644)
  - Francis Rous, English religious writer (died 1659)
  - Walter Yonge of Colyton, English diarist (died 1649)

== Deaths ==
- March 12 – Alessandro Piccolomini, Italian philosopher (born 1508)
- June 10 – William Whittingham, English Biblical scholar and translator (born 1524)
- November 21 – Cipriano Piccolpasso, Italian poet and author (born 1524)
- Unknown dates
  - Giovanni Battista Adriani, Italian historian (born 1511 or 1513)
  - Alonso de Molina, Spanish grammarian and lexicographer (born c. 1513)
  - William Seres, English printer
