= The Opportunity =

Play by James Shirley

The Opportunity is a Caroline era stage play, a comedy written by James Shirley, published in 1640. The play has been called "a capital little comedy, fairly bubbling over with clever situations, and charming character."

The Opportunity was licensed for performance by Sir Henry Herbert, the Master of the Revels, on 29 November 1634. It was acted by Shirley's regular company, Queen Henrietta's Men, at the Cockpit Theatre. The 1640 quarto was dedicated by Shirley to a personal friend, Capt. Richard Owen. Shirley relied on El Castigo del Penséque by Tirso de Molina as his source for the plot of his play.

The 1640 quarto was printed by Thomas Cotes for the booksellers Andrew Crooke and William Cooke. The play was popular, and was revived early in the Restoration era, in November 1660. During the Interregnum when the theatres were closed, material from The Opportunity was extracted and performed as a droll called The Price of Conceit, published in The Wits in 1672.

== Synopsis ==
Aurelio Andreozzi is a young gentleman from Milan. He comes to visit Urbino with his friend Pisauro. One in Urbino, Aurelio discovers that he is being mistaken for a man named Borgia, the son of an elderly aristocrat named Mercutio. As a lark, Aurelio allows the misapprehension to persist. It's a potentially serious situation: though recalled from banishment, Borgia has powerful potential enemies—he was accused of having murdered a brother of Ursini, the favorite of Urbino's ruling Duchess. Borgia also has a beautiful sister called Cornelia, a waiting woman to the Duchess—with whom Aurelio quickly falls in love.

Ursini, however, also loves Cornelia; to gain her favor he forgives her "brother," Borgia/Aurelio, and obtains a pardon for him from the Duchess. But Ursini also wants "Borgia" to give his blessing to his suit of Cornelia—a galling circumstance for Aurelio. Compounding the problem, Cornelia is in love with Aurelio, but is repulsed by what she thinks is the unnatural nature of her feelings. The Duchess, too, is enamored of Borgia/Aurelio, to the displeasure of her courtiers; and she is a beautiful and desirable woman who can make her husband a duke. Both Cornelia and Ursini react with jealousy at the Duchess's interest in Aurelio. Also displeased is the "ambassador" from Ferrara, who has been negotiating a potential marriage between his Duke and the Duchess of Urbino. (This "ambassador" is in fact the Duke of Ferrara himself.)

The complications come to a head in the play's balcony scene. In the night, below the balcony, stands Aurelio; unknown to him, the Duke of Ferrara watches from behind. Above, on the balcony, Cornelia pretends to be the Duchess; she tells Aurelio not to rely on her favor—"she" plans to marry the Duke. The Duke, of course, is delighted with this, and leaves. The Duchess comes upon this scene, and supplants Cornelia on the balcony; she in turn pretends to be Cornelia, and in this guise asks Aurelio to bless "her" marriage, that is Cornelia's marriage, with Ursini. Aurelio, thinking that he will lose both women, asserts his true identity: he tells "Cornelia" that he is not her brother, and asks her to love him for himself. The false Cornelia, surprised, gives him a little encouragement, but leaves him still in doubt.

Next morning, the Duchess tells Aurelio that she will help him to any Urbinese bride he fancies, even "the proudest, greatest in our duchy, without all limitations." Before they can come to an understanding, Cornelia enters to announce the Duke, who thinks he has the Duchess's agreement to marry him. The Duchess, of course, denies giving any such promise, and Cornelia confesses her part in the masquerade and the misunderstanding. Further misunderstandings ensue, however, with a misdirected love letter; in the end, the Duchess accepts the Duke and Cornelia accepts Ursini, and the befuddled Aurelio leaves Urbino to resume his travels.

The Opportunity also has a comic subplot, which involves Aurelio's servant Pimponio and a page.
