= 1632 in literature =

List of years in literature	(table)
- … 1622; 1623; 1624; 1625; 1626; 1627; 1628; 1629; 1630; 1631; 1632; 1633; 1634; 1635; 1636; 1637; 1638; 1639; 1640; 1641; 1642 …
- Art; Archaeology; Architecture; Literature; Music; Philosophy; Science; +...

This article contains information about the literary events and publications of 1632.

== Events ==
- February 11 – French Protestant pastor Nicolas Antoine is committed to an asylum in Geneva after converting to Judaism, being subsequently tried for heresy and brutally executed.
- February 14 – Tempe Restored, a masque written by Aurelian Townshend and designed by Inigo Jones, is performed at Whitehall Palace in London.
- March – King Charles I of England and Queen Henrietta Maria visit the University of Cambridge. The students of Trinity College perform Thomas Randolph's The Jealous Lovers and Peter Hausted's The Rival Friends. The latter causes a theatrical riot and ensuing scandal.
- May – Tirso de Molina is appointed chronicler of the Order of the Blessed Virgin Mary of Mercy.
- Late – William Prynne's Histrio-mastix: The Players Scourge, or Actors Tragædie, an attack on the English Renaissance theatre (dated 1633) is published in London.
- unknown date – The Second Folio of William Shakespeare's plays is printed in London by Thomas Cotes for Robert Allot and others. Among the prefatory matter is the first published poem by John Milton, printed anonymously, "An Epitaph on the Admirable Dramaticke Poet, W. Shakespeare".

== New books ==
=== Prose ===
- Diego Collado – Ars grammaticae Iaponicae linguae
- Phineas Fletcher – The Way to Blessedness and Joy in Tribulation
- Galileo Galilei – Dialogo sopra i due massimi sistemi del mondo (Dialogue Concerning the Two Chief World Systems)
- Juan Pérez de Montalbán – Para todos
- William Prynne – Histriomastix: the Player's Scourge, or Actor's Tragedy
- Henry Reynolds – Mythomystes

=== Drama ===
- William Alabaster – Roxana (Latin play, first performed in the 1590s, published)
- Richard Brome
  - The Weeding of Covent Garden (performed)
  - The Northern Lass (published)
- Nathan Field (died 1620) and Philip Massinger – The Fatal Dowry (published)
- Thomas Goffe (died 1629) – The Courageous Turk (published)
- Thomas Heywood – The Iron Age, Part 1 and 2 (published)
- Ben Jonson – The Magnetic Lady
- John Lyly (died 1606) – Six Court Comedies (published by Edward Blount), containing Campaspe, Endymion, Gallathea, Midas, Mother Bombie, and Sapho and Phao
- Jean Mairet – Les Galanteries du duc d'Ossonne
- Philip Massinger
  - The City Madam (performed)
  - The Maid of Honour published
- William Percy – Necromantes, or, The Two Supposed Heds: a Comicall Invention
- Thomas Randolph
  - The Jealous Lovers
  - The Muses' Looking-Glass
- William Rowley (died 1626; and others?) – A New Wonder, a Woman Never Vexed (published)
- James Shirley
  - The Ball
  - The Changes, or Love in a Maze
  - Hyde Park
- John Tatham – Love Crowns the End
- Aurelian Townshend – Tempe Restored (masque)

== Births ==
- January 1 – Katherine Philips, née Fowler, Anglo-Welsh poet, translator and woman of letters (died 1664)
- January 29 – Johann Georg Graevius, German classicist (died 1730)
- March 4 (baptised) – Lancelot Addison, English author and father of Joseph Addison (died 1703)
- June 10 – Esprit Fléchier, French historian and bishop (died 1710)
- August 29 – John Locke, English philosopher (died 1704)
- November 23 – Jean Mabillon, French palaeographer (died 1707)
- November 24 – Baruch Spinoza, Dutch philosopher (died 1677)
- December 17 – Anthony Wood, English antiquary (died 1695)
- Unknown date
  - Francis Kirkman, English bibliophile (died c. 1680)
  - Rahman Baba, Indian Pashto poet (died 1706)

== Deaths ==
- February 23 – Giambattista Basile, Neapolitan poet and fairy-tale collector (born c. 1570)
- April 20 – Nicolas Antoine, French theologian (executed, born c. 1602)
- May 5 – Luís de Sousa, Portuguese religious writer (born 1555)
- August 25 – Thomas Dekker, English dramatist (born c. 1572)
- By October – Edward Blount, English publisher (born 1562)
- Unknown dates
  - Aharon Ibn Hayyim, Moroccan Talmudic commentator (born 1545)
  - Alexandre Hardy, French dramatist (plague, born c. 1571)
  - George Percy, English explorer and diarist (born 1580)
  - John Webster, English dramatist (born c. 1580)
