= 1644 in literature =

List of years in literature	(table)
- … 1634; 1635; 1636; 1637; 1638; 1639; 1640; 1641; 1642; 1643; 1644; 1645; 1646; 1647; 1648; 1649; 1650; 1651; 1652; 1653; 1654 …
- Art; Archaeology; Architecture; Literature; Music; Philosophy; Science; +...

This article contains information about the literary events and publications of 1644.

== Events ==
- April 15 – The second Globe Theatre is demolished by the Puritan government to make room for housing.
- November 23 – The publication in London of Areopagitica; A speech of Mr. John Milton for the Liberty of Unlicenc’d Printing, to the Parlament of England.
- December (end) – English Puritan controversialist Hezekiah Woodward is questioned for two days about "scandalous" pamphlets.
- The publication of The Bloody Tenet of Persecution marks the start of a major controversy between Roger Williams and John Cotton on religious tolerance in a Calvinist context. The controversy plays out through a series of works issued by both men in the coming years, through to Williams' The Bloody Tenet Yet More Bloody (1652).

== New books ==
=== Prose ===
- John Milton
  - Areopagitica (tract against censorship)
  - Of Education
- Roger Williams – The Bloody Tenet of Persecution
- Francisco de Quevedo
  - Vida de Marco Bruto
  - Vida de San Pablo Apóstol
- Juan Eusebio Nieremberg – Vida del santo padre y gran siervo de Dios el beato Francisco de Borja
- René Descartes – Principia Philosophiae
- Marin Mersenne – Cogitata physico-mathematica
- Evangelista Torricelli – Opera geometrica
- Giulio Strozzi (editor) – Le glorie della signora Anna Renzi romana (published in Venice; a tribute to Anna Renzi, the "first diva")

=== Drama ===
- Lope de Vega – Fiestas del Santísimo Sacramento
- Pierre Corneille – Le Menteur
- Mildmay Fane, 2nd Earl of Westmorland – Virtue's Triumph

== Births ==
- August 6 – Louise de la Vallière, French royal mistress, subject of a Dumas novel (died 1710)
- October 2 – François-Timoléon de Choisy, French memoirist (died 1724)
- Unknown dates
  - Matsuo Bashō (松尾 芭蕉), Japanese poet (died 1694)
  - Elinor James, English pamphleteer (died 1719)

== Deaths ==
- January 30 – William Chillingworth, English religious controversialist (born 1602)
- March 5 – Ferrante Pallavicino, Italian satirist (born 1615)
- March 8 – Xu Xiake (徐霞客), Chinese travel writer and geographer (born 1587)
- September 7 – Cardinal Guido Bentivoglio, Italian historian (born 1579)
- September 8 – Francis Quarles, English poet (born 1592)
- November 10 – Luís Vélez de Guevara, Spanish dramatist and novelist (born 1579)
- November 21 – Raphael Sobiehrd-Mnishovsky, Czech lawyer and writer (born 1580)
