= The Coronation (play) =

Play by James Shirley

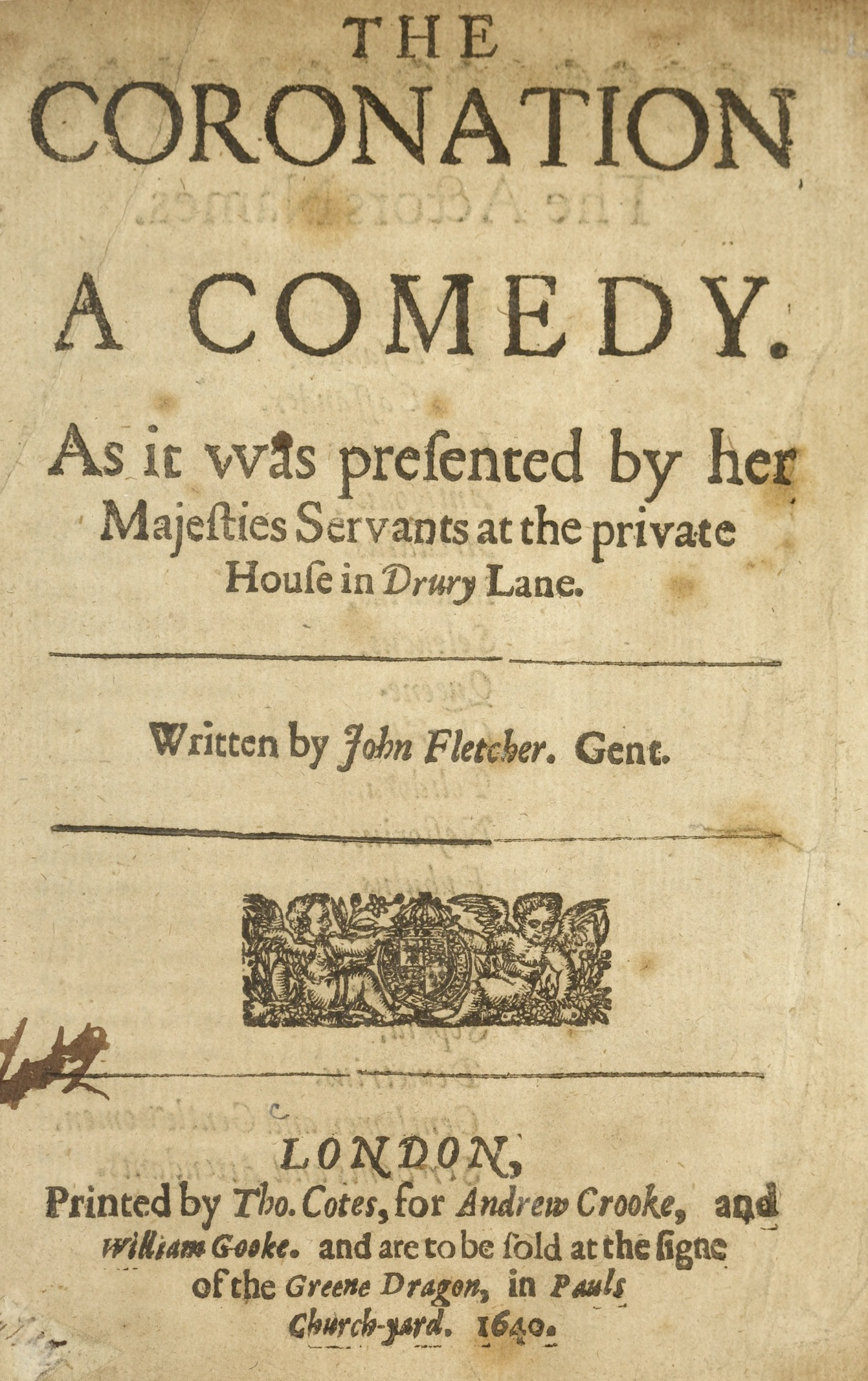
Title page of the first edition (1640), misattributed to John Fletcher

The Coronation is a Caroline era stage play, a tragicomedy written by James Shirley, and notable for the tug-of-war of authorship claims in which it was involved in the middle seventeenth century.

== Background ==
The play was licensed by the Master of the Revels on 6 February 1635, and was probably written in the previous year or so. In May 1636, however, the London theatres shut down for one of their longest and most severe closures due to bubonic plague. Shirley left for his four years in Dublin (1636–40), and in the next year or so the playing company for which he had been serving as house dramatist, Queen Henrietta's Men, sold off their stock of Shirley's plays to the London booksellers. The result was that a group of Shirley's plays appeared in print in the late 1630s. Most of these were published under Shirley's name; only one, The Coronation, was misattributed to another dramatist. The first edition of The Coronation was issued in 1640 in a quarto printed by Thomas Cotes for the booksellers Andrew Crooke and William Cooke. And the authorship of the play was assigned to John Fletcher.

The source of the misattribution is not certain, though the acting company has borne the brunt of the suspicion; they are thought to have sold a spurious play called Look to the Lady as Shirley's at about the same time. When he was back in London, Shirley attempted to reclaim his lost offspring; The Coronation was listed in "A Catalogue of the Authors Poems already Printed," printed in Six New Plays in 1653, as "Falsely ascribed to Jo. Fletcher." Shirley's reclamation effort was not entirely successful, however; The Coronation was included in the second Beaumont and Fletcher folio of 1679.

The confusion is perhaps understandable, since The Coronation is perhaps the one play in Shirley's canon in which Fletcher's influence is strongest and most obvious.

== Synopsis ==
The Kingdom of Epire (or Epirus) is ruled by a Lord Protector, Cassander, while its Queen, Sophia, is still a minor child—a time now coming to its end. Cassander is eager for the Queen to marry his son Lisimachus, as has long been planned; though the Queen manages matters so that the marriage will take place only after she assumes power.

Epire has long been troubled by a feud between the houses of two noblemen, Eubulus and Macarius. Seleucus, the warlike son of Eubulus and heir of his house, proposes a way to end the feud: a ceremonial combat or duel between himself and Arcadius, the nephew of Macarius. The Queen views the proposal ironically at first; Arcadius is a prominent young courtier, and she worries that "a small wound / I'th' head" may spoil his hairstyle. But she gives permission for the combat to take place. Both Eubulus and Macarius, however, are opposed to their young heirs facing the risk of injury or death, and stage an apparent reconciliation to cancel the duel.

Cassander expects the Queen to announce her choice of Lisimachus as her consort; he, and the court in general, are astounded when she chooses Arcadius instead. Macarius and the local Bishop intervene before the ceremony can occur; they reveal that Arcadius is actually Demetrius, a royal prince missing and assumed dead — and therefore the Queen's long-lost brother.

It transpires that Theodosius, the prior king and the Queen's father, had hidden his two young sons, Leonatus and Demetrius, through a fear that Cassander would usurp the throne and kill the princes after Theodosius's death. The king had believed, correctly, that Cassander would not do the same to Sophia, but would instead keep her in her place so that his son could attain the crown by marrying her. With the secret revealed, Demetrius is now recognized as the rightful king, and Sophia is displaced from direct power.

Arcadius's fiancée, Polidora, is suddenly superseded when the Queen decides to marry him — as Lisimachus is displaced at the same time. When the Queen is suddenly removed from power and her wedding cancelled, she suspects that Polidora is Lisimachus's new love, which generates a subplot of romantic cross-purposes, jealousies and misunderstandings.

Cassander, in a rage at the disruption of his well-laid plans, devises a plot to regain power: he intends to advance Seleucus as the elder missing prince, Leonatus, and so eject Arcadius/Demetrius from the throne. Since Seleucus bears a physical resemblance to the late Theodosius, Cassander thinks the plan can work. The intended coup d'état is mounted, only to encounter another twist of fate — Eubulus and the Bishop reveal that Seleucus actually is the missing Leonatus, and thus the true king of Epire. In the play's climax, Cassander is forgiven his treachery if he vows allegiance to the new monarch, and Leonatus achieves his rightful place as king; and the couples Demetrius and Polidora, and Sophia and Lisimachus, have their misunderstandings resolved and are happily united once again.
