= Love in a Maze =

1630s play by James Shirley

Changes: Or, Love in a Maze. A Comedie, as It was Presented at the Private House in Salisbury Court, by the Company of His Majesties Revels.
- Author: James Shirley
- Language: English
- Genre: Comedy of manners
- Publisher: Printed by G. P. for William Cooke, and are to be sold at his shop neere Furnivals Inne Gate in Holborne
- Publication date: 1632
- Publication place: London, England
- Pages: 69
- OCLC: 9200719

Changes: Or, Love in a Maze is a Caroline era stage play, a comedy of manners written by James Shirley, first published in 1632. It was one of Shirley's most popular comedies, especially in the Restoration era. The play (which involves an actual maze in its final act) is almost universally known by its subtitle.

== History ==
The play was licensed for performance by Sir Henry Herbert, the Master of the Revels, 10 January, 1632. Unusually for a Shirley play of this period, Love in a Maze was acted by the King's Revels Men at the Salisbury Court Theatre, rather than the troupe for which Shirley normally wrote, Queen Henrietta's Men.

The 1632 quarto was published by the bookseller William Cooke, and was dedicated to "the right honourable the Lady Dorothy Shirley," the wife of Sir Robert Shirley, baronet. Shirley the dramatist may have been related to this prominent Shirley family of Warwickshire.

The play was revived and performed often during the Restoration; Samuel Pepys saw it five times between May 1662 and April 1668, as recorded in his famous Diary. The comic actor John Lacy achieved a great popular success in the role of Johnny Thump. Love in a Maze was also performed at the Inns of Court in 1664, and John Dryden adapted material from the play for his The Maiden Queen (1668).

Shirley's popular play influenced subsequent works by other writers of his era, including The Lovesick Court by Richard Brome and The Ladies' Privilege by Henry Glapthorne.

== Synopsis ==
Gerard, a fashionable young gentleman about town, is in love with two sisters, Chrysolina and Aurelia, and is unable to choose between them. Compounding the difficulty, they both love him. (Mrs. Goldsworth, their mother, wants Aurelia to marry Sir Gervase Simple, a rich but clownish newly minted knight.) Gerard wants his friend Thornay to fall in love with one of the sisters himself, so that Gerard can then choose the other. The sisters, though, are not receptive to this arrangement, and dismiss both the young men.

Eugenia is a former inamorata of Thornay. Eugenia's uncle wants her to marry Yongrave, who loves her; but Eugenia employs Yongrave to ask Thornay to return to her. Chrysolina learns of Thornay's abandonment of Eugenia and Yongrave's noble and chivalrous conduct in the matter; she falls in love with Yongrave as a result — thus solving Gerard's original problem. Thornay returns to Eugenia, leaving Gerard with Aurelia. Sir Gervase Simple falls in love with and marries a Lady Bird, who turns out to be a boy page in disguise, put up for the prank by Caperwit the poetaster.

Three contented couples and a wedding masque provide the appropriate ending for the comedy. The main plot is supported by a roster of comic figures, notably the previously mentioned Sir Gervase Simple and Caperwit, and Johnny Thump, the servant of Sir Gervase.
