= The Gamester (Shirley) =

Play by James Shirley

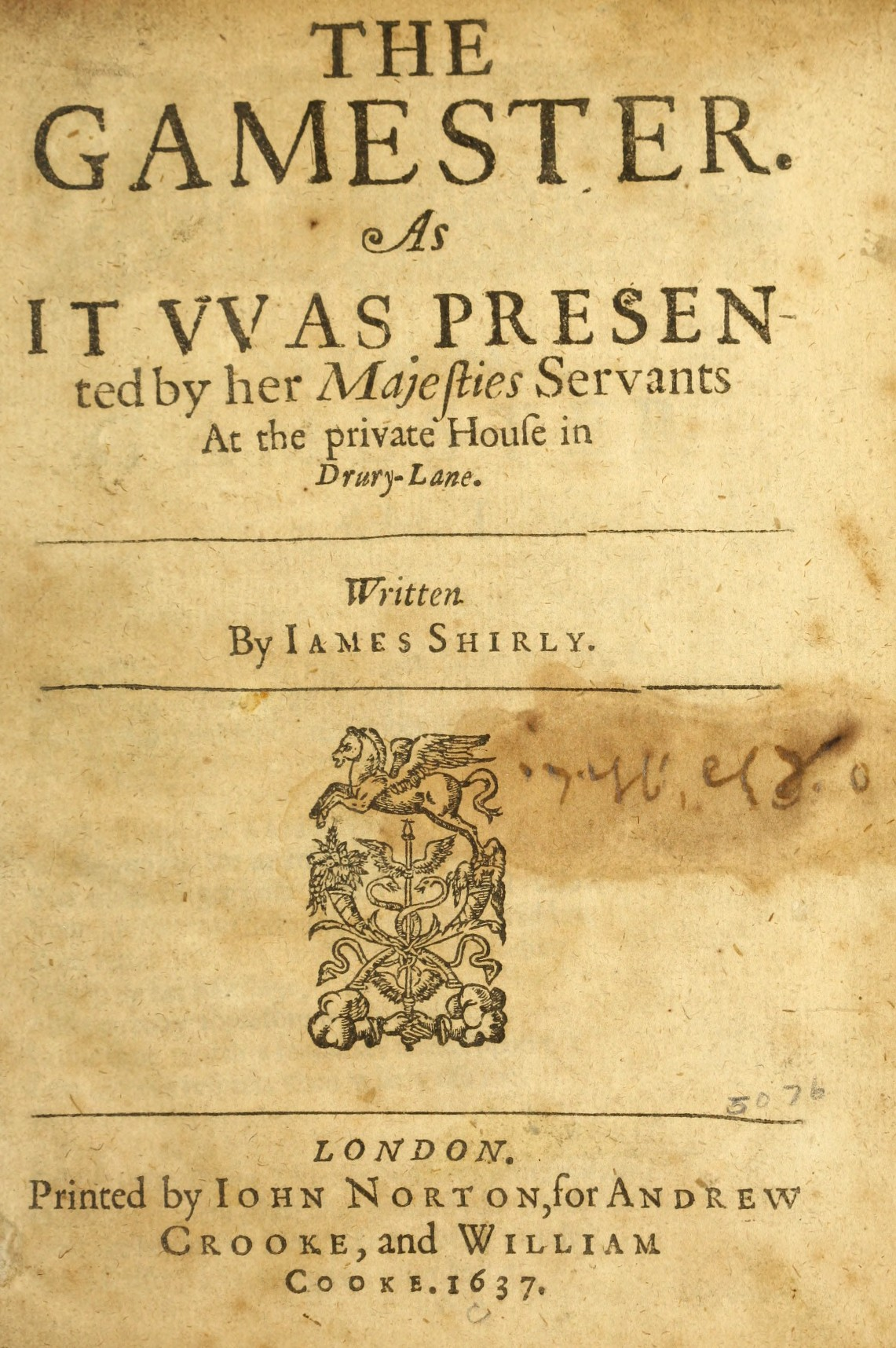
Title page of the first edition of 1637

The Gamester is a Caroline era stage play, a comedy of manners written by James Shirley, premiered in 1633 and first published in 1637. The play is noteworthy for its realistic and detailed picture of gambling in its era.

The play was licensed for performance by Sir Henry Herbert, the Master of the Revels, on 11 November 1633. In his office record book, Herbert noted that on 6 February 1634,

"The Gamester was acted at Court, made by Sherley, out of a plot of the King's, given him by me; and well liked. The King said it was the best play he had seen for seven years."

Apart from the King's suggestion, Shirley's source for the plot of his play is the Ducento novelle of Celio Malespini.

The play was performed by Queen Henrietta's Men, both at Court and at the regular theatre, the Cockpit in Drury Lane. The 1637 quarto was printed by John Norton for the booksellers Andrew Crooke and William Cooke.

Shirley's play was a popular success in its own era, and in the next century was adapted by Charles Johnson into The Wife's Relief (1711) and J. Poole (The Wife's Stratagem, 1827).

== Synopsis ==
In the main plot, the protagonist, Wilding, neglects his faithful and loving wife in favour of her ward Penelope; he even orders his wife to solicit her ward for him. Mistress Wilding appears to obey, and informs Wilding that she has arranged an assignation. When the time comes, however, Wilding is so wrapped up in his gambling that he sends his friend Hazard to keep the appointment and make his excuses. The next day, Wilding is doubly distressed to learn from Hazard that the meeting was for him, in romantic terms, a wonderful success, and from his wife that she had taken Penelope's place the night before. To conceal his shame, Wilding arranges for Hazard to marry Penelope, and doubles her dowry. (Since Hazard and Penelope were already in love, this is all to the good as far as they are concerned.) Once Wilding has repented of his shameful ways, he is told the truth: Hazard found both women waiting on the night in question, prepared to admonish the wayward husband. Together the three of them planned Wilding's comeuppance.

In the play's subplot, a wealthy citizen called Old Barnacle desires his nephew (inevitably known as Young Barnacle) to acquire a reputation as a gallant and a man about town. To achieve this, Old Barnacle pays Hazard, who has just such a reputation, £100 to allow Young Barnacle to strike him in a gambling house. The ploy is, if anything, too successful: Young Barnacle instantly wins a reputation as a bravo and picks quarrels wherever he goes. Old Barnacle, now frightened that his nephew will soon get himself killed, pays Hazard another £100 to undo the mischief. Hazard gives Young Barnacle his required and merited beating, and then reveals the entire matter. This subplot features the candid picture of the world of tavern and gambling house for which the play is noted, with supporting characters named Little-stock, Acre-less, and Sell-Away.

The third-level plot is unusual in being romantic and dramatic instead of the normal comic subplot; it involves the lovers Delamore and Leonora, and Beaumont and Violante. Beaumont is imprisoned, charged with killing Delamore in a duel. Sir Richard Hurry, Leonora's father and the judge in the case, orders his daughter to marry Beaumont, and claims that he will provide Beaumont's pardon if the marriage occurs. Beaumont, however, refuses to betray his commitment to Violante. In a final confrontation, Beaumont remains faithful to his love; Hurry condemns Beaumont...to marry Violante. It transpires that Delamore has survived the duel and is recovering.
