= The Example =

Play by James Shirley

The Example is a Caroline era stage play, a comedy written by James Shirley, first published in 1637. The play has repeatedly been acclaimed both as one of Shirley's best comedies and one of the best works of its generation. And it provides one of the clearest demonstrations in Shirley's canon of the influence of the works of Ben Jonson on the younger dramatist's output.

The play was licensed for performance by Sir Henry Herbert, the Master of the Revels, on 24 June 1634. Like the majority of Shirley's plays, The Example was acted by Queen Henrietta's Men at the Cockpit Theatre. The 1637 quarto was printed by John Norton for the booksellers Andrew Crooke and William Cooke, the stationers who issued five plays by Shirley in that year alone. The quarto shows signs of having been printed from the author's working drafts or "foul papers," making it highly unusual among the early printed editions of Shirley's plays.

== Synopsis ==
The drama portrays a profligate lord named Fitzavarice, and his involvement with Sir Walter Peregrine and his wife. Pressed by massive debts, especially to Lord Fitzavarice, Sir Walter takes up soldiering and becomes a captain. While Captain Peregrine is absent on his military service, Fitzavarice attempts to seduce Mistress Peregrine, offering to discharge her husband's debts if she submits to him. She resists his importunities, and faints when he tries to force her. Guilt and embarrassment work a reformation on him: Fitzavarice presents her with the mortgage and adds a precious jewel in admiration of her steadfastness.

At this critical juncture Sir Walter returns, having travelled home clandestinely, risking arrest for debt. Learning about the surrender of the mortgage, he assumes the worst and challenges Fitzavarice to a duel. The Lord accepts, but his second, a follower named Confident Rapture, arranges for the Captain to be apprehended for debt and so save his master the risks of single combat. Fitzavarice, however, pays the Captain's remaining debts and arranges for his release from prison. Peregrine now realizes his error and accepts his wife's virtue; but when he attempts to reconcile with Fitzavarice, the Lord refuses him, and insists that they meet on the "field of honor." When both are wounded in their combat, the demands of honor are satisfied; the two men become friends.

The Example employs the multiple-plot structure typical of Shirley's plays. The secondary plot (or first subplot) involves the comical suitors that are a fixture of Shirley's comic domain. Jacinta has two ridiculous rival suitors, Vainman and Pumicestone. She playfully torments them, insisting that Vainman never speak in her presence, while Pumicestone must do the opposite of whatever she commands. Jacinta is also courted by Confident Rapture, who has a sinister plan to prostitute her to Lord Fitzavarice; and by the Lord himself, who loves her sincerely.

The third-level plot concerns the uncle of Mistress Peregrine and Jacinta, Sir Solitary Plot, "a character compounded of Jonson's Morose in Epicene and Jonson's Sir Politic Would-Be in Volpone." The result is an interesting study of paranoia in a 17th-century context: Sir Solitary sees enemies everywhere and hides in his residence for safety. His servants Dormant and Oldrat are similar Jonsonian "humors" characters. Sir Solitary is jolted out of his obsession by a real but beneficent plot, engineered by Jacinta.
