= 1635 in literature =

| List of years in literature | (table) |
- … 1625; 1626; 1627; 1628; 1629; 1630; 1631; 1632; 1633; 1634; 1635; 1636; 1637; 1638; 1639; 1640; 1641; 1642; 1643; 1644; 1645 …
- Art; Archaeology; Architecture; Literature; Music; Philosophy; Science; +...

This article contains information about the literary events and publications of 1635.

== Events ==
- February 22 – In Paris, the Académie française is founded.
- May 6 – The King's Men perform Othello at the Blackfriars Theatre in London.
- July 16 – Birth of René Descartes' daughter, Francine, at Deventer.
- August 23 – A few days before his death, beset by family troubles, Lope de Vega writes his last poems.
- Ottoman Turkish poet Nef'i is garroted in the grounds of the Topkapı Palace in Istanbul for his satirical verses.
- Wallachian statesman Udriște Năsturel pays lyrical tribute to Prince Matei Basarab, his brother-in-law. Though composed and published in Slavonic, this is the first blason in Romanian literature, and by some accounts the first-ever Romanian poem.

== New books ==
=== Prose ===
- Sir Kenelm Digby – A Conference with a Lady about choice of a Religion
- Thomas Heywood – The Hierarchy of the Blessed Angels
- Tirso de Molina – Deleitar aprovechando
- John Selden – Mare Clausum

=== Drama ===
- Francis Bristowe – King Free-Will
- Richard Brome – The Sparagus Garden
- Pierre Corneille – Médée
- William Davenant
  - News from Plymouth
  - The Platonick Lovers
  - The Temple of Love (masque)
- Pedro Calderón de la Barca – Life is a Dream (La vida es sueño)
- Isaac de Benserade – Cléopâtre
- Henry Glapthorne
  - The Hollander
  - The Lady Mother (attr.)
- Richard Lovelace – The Scholars
- Jean Mairet – Le Marc-Antoine, ou la Cléopâtre
- Thomas Nabbes – Hannibal and Scipio
- Jean Rotrou – La Bague de l'oubli
- Joseph Rutter – The Shepherd's Holiday performed at Court and published
- James Shirley – The Coronation, The Lady of Pleasure performed; The Traitor published

=== Poetry ===
See 1635 in poetry

== Births ==
- January 13 – Philipp Jakob Spener, German theologian (died 1706)
- February 1 – Marquard Gude, German classicist and archeologist (died 1689)
- February 21 – Thomas Flatman, English poet and miniaturist (died 1688)
- June 3 – Philippe Quinault, French dramatist and librettist (died 1688)
- September 20 (baptism) – Thomas Sprat, English theologian and bishop (died 1713)

== Deaths ==
- March – Thomas Randolph, English poet and dramatist (born 1605)
- April 7 – Leonard Digges, English poet (born 1588)
- April 25 – Alessandro Tassoni, Italian poet (born 1565)
- July 28 – Richard Corbet (Richard Corbett), English poet and bishop (born 1582)
- August (burial) – Richard Whitbourne, English Newfoundland colonist and writer (born 1561)
- August 27 – Lope de Vega, Spanish dramatist and poet (born 1562)
- October 18 – Jean de Schelandre, French poet (born c. 1585)
- November 8 – Aodh Buidhe Mac an Bhaird, Irish poet, historian and friar (born c. 1593)
- November 25 – Dr John Hall, English medical writer and son-in-law of William Shakespeare (born 1575)
