= Thomas Drue =

Thomas Drue or Drewe (c.1586–1627) was an English Protestant playwright.

He wrote The Life of the Duchess of Suffolk. It has also been suggested that he wrote The Bloody Banquet (By T. D.,’ 1620, 4to)., However others have attributed it to Thomas Dekker and Thomas Middleton. An unpublished play, the ‘Woman's Mistake,’ is ascribed in the ‘Stationers' Registers,’ 9 Sept. 1653, to Robert Davenport and Drue. Possibly the dramatist may be the Thomas Drewe who in 1621 translated and published Daniel Ben Alexander, the converted Jew, first written in Syriacke and High Dutch by himselfe.

== The Life of Katherine Willoughby, the Duchess of Suffolk ==
Drue is the author of a historical play, ‘The Life of the Dvtches of Svffolke,’ 1631, 4to, which has been wrongly attributed by Gerard Langbaine and others to Thomas Heywood. The play was published anonymously, but it is assigned to Drue in the ‘Stationers Registers’ (under date 13 November 1629) and in Sir Henry Herbert's ‘Office-book.’

This play was first produced during a period in which James I was active in suppressing criticism of his foreign policy, particularly the attempt to marry the future Charles I to the Catholic Maria Anna of Spain. The play was staged by the Palsgrave's Men, a theatre troupe sponsored by Frederick of the Palatinate. Drawing on the flight and exile of Catherine Willoughby, one of the Marian exiles, Drue further embellished the story recorded in Foxe's Book of Martyrs, making the story closer to that of Frederick's wife Elizabeth of Bohemia, James I's daughter. In this way the play highlighted the plight of Elizabeth, who had been forced into exile from the Palatinate following the defeat of the Protestant cause at the Battle of White Mountain, fought near Prague in 1620.
