= John Reynolds (writer) =

English merchant and writer

John Reynolds (c.1588 – c.1655) was an English merchant and writer from Exeter. He produced a series of violent stories around marriage, adultery and murder, as well as some political writings that caused him to be imprisoned.

== Life ==
Reynolds travelled in France on business, and was probably resident there from 1619. His pamphlets caused him to be extradited from France and imprisoned by James I of England in 1624. He married in 1626, again in 1644, and is recorded in 1655 but not later.

== Works ==
Reynolds wrote moral tales, poetry, political pamphlets around the time of the proposed Spanish match, and also translated works from the French.

=== Stories ===
He published in 1621 a first instalment of moralistic but sensational stories; he feigned that these were translations from the French, but in fact they were of his own composition. The collective title of what became a series of publications was The Triumphs of God's Revenge against the crying and execrable Sinne of Murther. Five other similar collections followed the first one, in separate volumes. These tales had a long subsequent publishing history; and in their own period they formed source material for the stage plays The Changeling and The Maid's Revenge.

In 1635 the six parts were collected in a single volume, but with each book still having separate titles and dedications. This collection was reissued in 1639 and in 1640 (the 'second edition'). A Dutch translation appeared at Amsterdam in 1667. A later edition, dated 1669 and illustrated by woodcuts, was edited by Samuel Pordage, who dedicated it to Lord Shaftesbury, and added an unpublished piece assigned to Reynolds, God's Revenge against the abominable Sin of Adultery, containing ten several Histories; further editions appeared in 1708 and 1779

=== Poetry ===
Dolarnys Primrose was an early work, published in 1606. In 1650 Reynolds published an imitation of the Arcadia, with interspersed verse, entitled The Flower of Fidelitie: displaying, in a continuate historie, the various adventures of three foreign princes (London, 1650); a seventh edition, with alterations, bore the alternative title of the Garden of Love (London, 1721). Reynolds dedicated his romance, which may also have been written in early life, to William Waltham, his father-in-law. He is credited with another poem that remained unpublished, entitled Love's Laurel Garland.

=== Political pamphlets ===
Vox coeli and Votivae Angliae (around 1624, and often attributed to Thomas Scott) concern respectively the Spanish match and the politics of the Electorate of the Palatinate, bound up with the outbreak of the Thirty Years' War.

=== Translations ===
Reynolds also translated works by French authors:

- A Treatise of the Court (1622), from the French of Eustache de Refuge, dedicated to Charles, Prince of Wales;
- The Judgment of Humane Actions (1629), from the French of Leonard Marrauld;
- The Divine Pourtrait (1631), from the French of Jean Mestrezat.
