= The Maid's Revenge =

Play by James Shirley

The Maid's Revenge is an early Caroline era stage the play, the earliest extant tragedy by James Shirley. It was first published in 1639.

The Maid's Revenge was licensed for performance by Sir Henry Herbert, the Master of the Revels, on 9 February 1626. It was the second of Shirley's plays to be produced (after Love Tricks in 1625). The play was acted by Queen Henrietta's Men at the Cockpit Theatre, as were most of Shirley's plays in this era. The 1639 quarto was issued by the bookseller William Cooke, and was dedicated by Shirley to Henry Osborne, esq.

Shirley based his plot on the seventh story in the collection by John Reynolds called The Triumphs of God's Revenge Against the Crying and Execrable Sin of Murder.

Critics have been divided on the merits of the play. Schelling, who judged it positively, described it as "a tragedy of much promise, full of swift action, capably plotted, and fluently and lucidly written." The play was revived on the stage during the Restoration era.

== Synopsis ==
The setting is Avero in Portugal; the story involves two noble families. An elderly lord, Gaspar de Vilarezo, has a son, Sebastiano, and two daughters, Catalina and Berinthia. Their contemporaries are Antonio and his sister Castabella; Sebastiano and Antonio are close friends. Antonio is in love with Berinthia; but old lord Gaspar believes that his elder daughter Catalina must be married before the younger can entertain a suitor. Antonio, therefore, pretends to be courting Catalina so that he can see Berinthia — and Catalina falls for her apparent suitor.

Catalina discovers that she has been fooled and used; she locks up her sister and arranges for her to be kidnapped and poisoned. But Antonio discovers the plot and is able to forestall it; he rescues Berinthia and takes her to his castle. Sebastiano comes to demand satisfaction, but finds Antonio's explanation acceptable. His own motives are complicated: he stays to court Castabella.

The vengeful Catalina demands revenge, though, and persuades her father: Gaspar orders his son Sebastiano to kill Antonio. Though the two young men remain friends and are engaged to each other's sisters, the demands of the aristocratic code of honor are inescapable. They duel, and Antonio is slain. Vengeance appears to run in Gaspar's family: Berinthia, mourning her lost love, embarks on revenge of her own. She stabs her brother Sebastiano, poisons her sister Catalina, and then stabs herself.

Like most tragedies of the era, The Maid's Revenge leavens its tragic plot with some comic materials, including the Count de Montenegro, the type of comic suitor that is a staple of Shirley's drama.

== Sources ==
- Forsythe, Robert Stanley. The Relations of Shirley's Plays to the Elizabethan Drama. New York, Columbia University Press, 1914.
- Nason, Arthur Huntington. James Shirley, Dramatist: A Biographical and Critical Study. New York, 1915; reprinted New York, Benjamin Blom, 1967.
- Schelling, Felix Emmanuel. Elizabethan Drama 1558–1642. 2 Volumes, Boston, Houghton Mifflin, 1908.
