= Second Folio =

1632 second edition of the works of William Shakespeare

Mr. William Shakespeares Comedies, Histories, & Tragedies
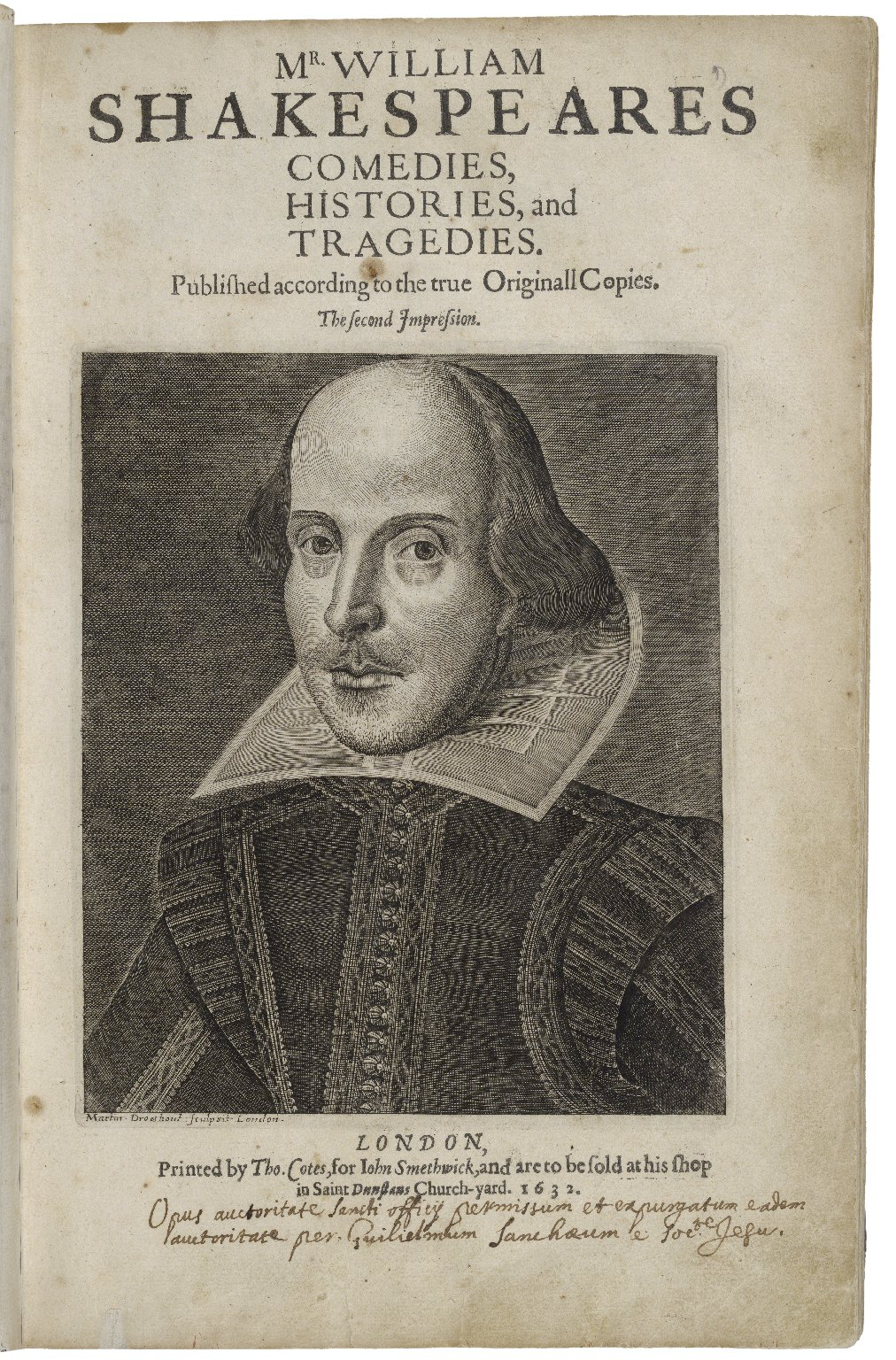
- Title page of the second folio (1632), this copy with a certificate of a censor for the Inquisition.
- Author: William Shakespeare
- Cover artist: Martin Droeshout
- Language: Early Modern English
- Genre: English Renaissance theatre
- Publisher: Thomas Cotes
- Publication date: 1632
- Publication place: England

The Second Folio is the 1632 edition of the collected plays of William Shakespeare. It follows the First Folio of 1623. Much language was updated in the Second Folio and there are almost 1,700 changes.

== Background and conception ==
The major partners in the First Folio had passed from the publishing scene by the time of the Second Folio: William Jaggard—official printer to the city of London (17 December 1610)—had died in 1623, and his son Isaac in 1627. Edward Blount, the third major partner, had sold his rights to Shakespearean plays to Robert Allot in 1630 and died in 1632. Allot was the prime mover in the creation of the Second Folio. The two minor partners in the First Folio, William Aspley and John Smethwick, continued as partners in the Second Folio syndicate; Aspley owned the rights to Much Ado About Nothing and Henry IV, Part 2, while Smethwick owned the rights to Love's Labour's Lost, Romeo and Juliet, Hamlet, and The Taming of the Shrew. Allot, Aspley, and Smethwick were joined by two other publishers: Richard Hawkins and Richard Meighen. Hawkins owned the rights to Othello, while Meighen owned the rights to The Merry Wives of Windsor.

== Printing ==
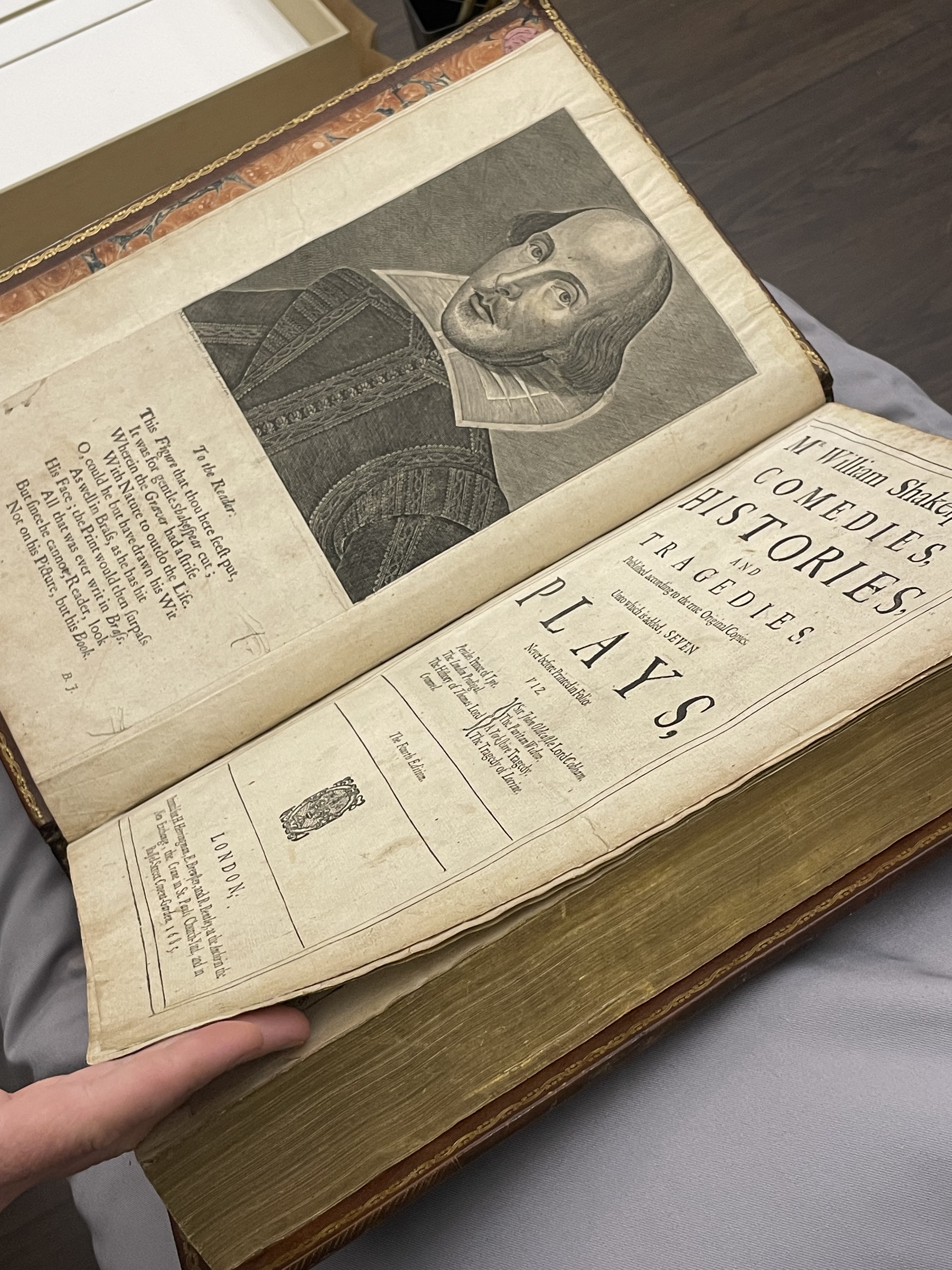
William Shakespeare, William Shakespeare's Comedies, Histories, and Tragedies (London: Thomas Coates, 1632); Pequot Library Special Collections

The printing of the Second Folio was done by Thomas Cotes. Individual copies of the Second Folio were issued with title-page inscriptions to each of the five publishers, in the format "printed by Thomas Cotes for Robert Allot," "...for William Aspley," etc. It appears that each of the booksellers in the syndicate took a specific consignment of the press run to sell at his shop, the size of the consignment depending upon his level of participation in the project. In all copies, though, a colophon at the end of the book gives the full list of publishers. By one account, the surviving volumes of the Second Folio inscribed for Robert Allot outnumber those for the other four publishers taken altogether, by about two to one — a fact that reflects Allot's dominance in the endeavour. The Hawkins imprint is "exceedingly rare," and "Not more than three or four copies are known with the Smethwick imprint...." Though all copies of the Second Folio are dated 1632, some in fact are remainder issues that were released as late as 1641 and after.

== Contents ==
Among the prefatory matter is the first published poem by John Milton, printed anonymously, "An Epitaph on the admirable Dramaticke Poet, W. Shakespeare".

== Notable copies ==
King Charles I owned a copy of the Second Folio, which became part of the library of Windsor Castle; Charles II's copy is in the British Library. The so-called Perkins Folio, which John Payne Collier used for his forged emendations of Shakespeare's text, was a copy of the Second Folio.
