= 1640 in literature =

List of years in literature	(table)
- … 1630; 1631; 1632; 1633; 1634; 1635; 1636; 1637; 1638; 1639; 1640; 1641; 1642; 1643; 1644; 1645; 1646; 1647; 1648; 1649; 1650 …
- Art; Archaeology; Architecture; Literature; Music; Philosophy; Science; +...

This article contains information about the literary events and publications of 1640.

== Events ==
- January 21 – Salmacida Spolia, a masque written by Sir William Davenant and designed by Inigo Jones, is performed at Whitehall Palace. It is the final royal masque of the Caroline era.
- March 17 (St. Patrick's Day) – Henry Burnell's play Landgartha is first performed, at the Werburgh Street Theatre in Dublin. It is one of the earliest plays from a native Irish playwright.
- c. April 16 – James Shirley returns to England from Ireland.
- May 4 – Theatre manager William Beeston is sent to the Marshalsea Prison for staging a play (possibly Richard Brome's The Court Beggar or his The Queen and Concubine) which offends the Stuart regime. This constitutes the only repression of the theatre to occur during the reign of King Charles I.
- May 28 – Pedro Calderón de la Barca joins the Catalan campaign led by the Duke of Olivares.
- English Cavalier poet Richard Lovelace, serving in the Bishops' Wars in Scotland, writes "To Lucasta, Going to the Warres" (published 1649) and the unperformed tragedy The Soldier (lost).

== New books ==
- The Bay Psalm Book, the first book printed in North America
- Uriel da Costa – Exemplar Humanae Vitae
- Diego de Saavedra Fajardo – Idea de un príncipe político cristiano (literally, "The Idea of a Christian Political Prince;" in English, The Royal Politician)
- Thomas Fuller – Joseph's Partly-coloured Coat
- James Howell – Dodona's Grove
- Cornelius Jansen – Augustinus
- Thomas Stephens – Arte da lingoa Canarim, a grammar of the Konkani language
- John Wilkins – A Discourse Concerning a New Planet
- Francisco de Rioja – Aristarco o censura de la proclamación católica de los catalanes
- Baltasar Gracián – El político Don Fernando el Católico
- Juan Eusebio Nieremberg – De la diferencia entre lo temporal y lo eterno. Crisol de desengaño

== New drama ==
- Henry Burnell – Landgartha
- Pierre Corneille – Horace
- William Davenant – Salmacida Spolia
- John Fletcher & James Shirley – The Night Walker (published)
- Henry Glapthorne – The Hollander, Wit in a Constable, and The Ladies' Privilege (published)
- John Gough – The Strange Discovery
- William Habington – The Queen of Arragon
- Samuel Harding – Sicily and Naples
- Jean Mairet – L’Illustre corsaire
- Nathaniel Richards – Messalina (published)
- Joseph Rutter- The Cid, Part 2 (published)
- George Sandys – Christ's Passion (English translation of Hugo Grotius's Christus Patiens)
- Lewis Sharpe – The Noble Stranger published
- James Shirley – The Imposture performed; a single-volume collection of eight plays published; The Arcadia, The Humorous Courtier, and Saint Patrick for Ireland published; The Coronation published but misattributed to John Fletcher
- Francisco de Rojas Zorrilla – Los bandos de Verona
- Pedro Calderón de la Barca – Psiquis y Cupido
- Valentín de Céspedes – Las glorias del mejor siglo
- Lope de Vega – Parte XXIV de comedias
- Entremeses nuevos
- Fray Alonso Remón – Las tres mujeres en una
- Francisco de Rojas Zorrilla
  - Donde hay agravios no hay celos
  - No hay amigo para amigo
  - Progne y Filomena

== Poetry ==
- Thomas Carew – Poems
- Robert Sempill the younger – The Life and Death of Habbie Simpson, Piper of Kilbarchan
- John Tatham – Fancy's Theatre
- Romances varios de diversos autores

== Births ==
- April 2 – Marianna Alcoforado, Portuguese nun and purported letter-writer (died 1723)
- June 5 – Pu Songling (蒲松龄), Chinese writer (died 1715)
- August 8 – Amalia Catharina, German poet (died 1697)
- September 6 – Heinrich Brewer, German historian (died c. 1713)
- December 6 – Claude Fleury, French historian (died 1723)
- December 14 (baptized) – Aphra Behn (Eaffrey Johnson), English dramatist (died 1689)

Uncertain dates

- David-Augustin de Brueys, French theologian and dramatist (died 1723)
- Madame de Villedieu, French dramatist and novelist (died 1683)

== Deaths ==
- January 25 – Robert Burton, English scholar (born 1577)
- February/March – Richard Rowlands, English antiquary (born c. 1550)
- March 8 (burial) – Samuel Ward, English Puritan preacher and writer (born 1577)
- March 17 – Philip Massinger, English dramatist (born 1583)
- March 22 – Thomas Carew, English poet (born 1595)
- April – Uriel da Costa, Portuguese philosopher (born c. 1585)
- April 2 – Paul Fleming, German poet (born 1609)
- April 28 (burial) – William Alabaster, English poet and playwright (born 1567)
- May 30 – André Duchesne, French historian (born 1584)
- October 1 – Claudio Achillini, Italian philosopher and poet (born 1574)
- December
  - William Aspley, English publisher (born c. 1573)
  - Sir John Melton, English politician and writer (unknown year of birth)
- unknown dates
  - Charles Aleyn, English poet (unknown year of birth)
  - Daniel Naborowski, Polish Baroque poet (born 1573)
- probable – Elizabeth Melville, Scottish poet (born c. 1578)
