= The Ball (play) =

Play written by James Shirley

The Ball is a Caroline comedy by James Shirley, first performed in 1632 and first published in 1639.

The Ball was licensed for performance by Sir Henry Herbert, the Master of the Revels, on 16 November 1632. Herbert, however, was not happy with the play: in a note in his office book dated two days later, 18 November, he complained that the play showed "diverse personated so naturally, both of lords and others of the Court, that I took it ill, and would have forbidden the play" – but impresario Christopher Beeston promised Herbert that everything that Herbert disliked in the play would be fixed before the performance. The desired changes must have been made satisfactorily since the play was acted by Queen Henrietta's Men at the Cockpit Theatre.

The 1639 quarto publication of the play, printed by Thomas Cotes for the booksellers Andrew Crooke and William Cooke, confused subsequent generations of critics since the title page attributes the play to both Shirley and George Chapman. The play, a light comedy of manners, is entirely like the style of Shirley, and nothing like the style of Chapman. Most scholars now think that the dual attribution is simply a mistake, a point of confusion by the publishers: The Tragedy of Chabot, Admiral of France, a Chapman play that had been revised by Shirley, was printed in the same year by the same house.

Traditional critics sometimes complained about the frothy amorality of The Ball – judging it to display a "coarseness...unflattering" to the social set depicted. Yet Herbert's adverse reaction to the accuracy of the play suggests that even the revised version may have a certain journalistic quality, showing what the Court of Charles I was actually like.

== Synopsis ==
The Ball portrays people of fashionable society preparing for a Courtly ball. The main plot centers on the widowed Lady Lucina, a "scornful lady" who enjoys mocking her unwanted suitors. Three of them, Lamont, Travers, and Bostock, she successfully dismisses; a fourth, Colonel Winfield, she openly ridicules. Winfield, however, has won the good graces of Lady Lucina's maid; with inside information, he manipulates both the other suitors and the Lady herself. Lucina agrees to marry him if he swears that he has been virtuous. Winfield, a man of the world, refuses to take a false oath; in so doing, he paradoxically proves himself honest. He passes a further test as well, agreeing to meet Lady Lucina's six children from her first marriage – children who do not exist.

The subplot involves the rivalry of Honoria and Rosamund over the affections of Lord Rainbow. He, overhearing their conversation, tells them he loves them equally and leaves them to decide the issue between themselves. In his absence, Lamont and Travers, two of Lucina's rejected suitors, enter and court Honoria and Rosamund. Each woman tells her suitor that the other woman is in love with him; the two men fall for this trick, only to be told that it was a test, which they have failed. The uncomfortable situation is resolved by the arrival of the ladies' dancing master.

At the ball, the two women confront Lord Rainbow, telling him they cannot decide the issue between them, and ask him to choose between them by lot. He does – and finds that both lots are blank. Lord Rainbow accepts his chastisement gracefully and gives each woman a jewel.

The two plots are filled out with comic material, involving characters including Mr. Frisk the dancing master, and the clowns Freshwater and Gudgeon. Freshwater is a pretended traveller, who reveals through his clumsiness and ignorance that he has never left England.
