= The Bloody Banquet =

Anonymous 17th-century English play

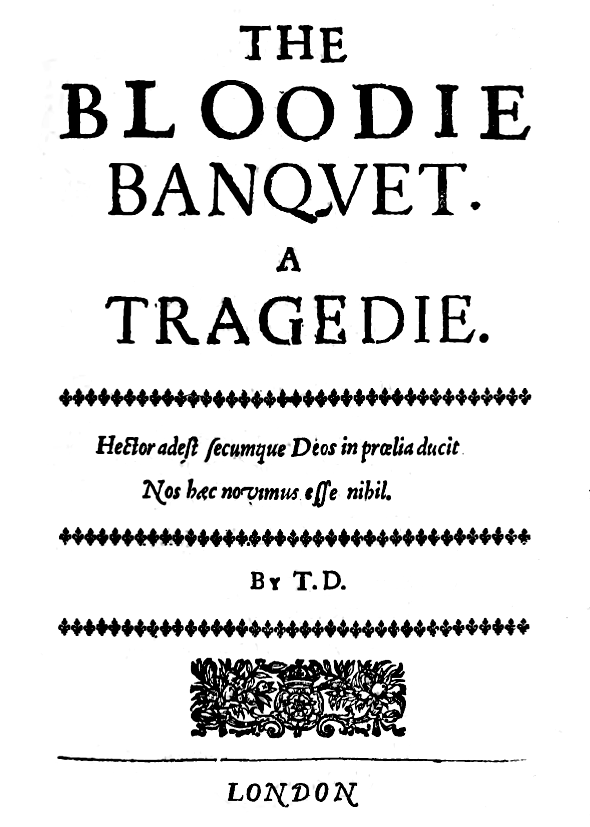
Title page of The Bloody Banquet

The Bloody Banquet is an early 17th-century play, a revenge tragedy of uncertain date and authorship, attributed on its title page only to "T.D." It has attracted a substantial body of critical and scholarly commentary, chiefly for the challenging authorship problem it presents. It has been attributed to a collaboration between Thomas Dekker and Thomas Middleton.

== Publication ==
The Bloody Banquet was never entered into the Register of the Stationers Company, but an order from the Lord Chamberlain (then Philip Herbert, 4th Earl of Pembroke), dated 19 August 1639, lists it among forty plays that are the property of William Beeston and can be performed only by his company, Beeston's Boys. It was first published in quarto in the same year, 1639, by Thomas Cotes, with the attribution to "T. D." on its title page.

== Sources ==
The play draws its plot from Pan His Syrinx (1584, 1597) by William Warner. The playwright(s) took elements from four of the seven stories in Warner's volume, to create a revenge tale in which a Tyrant serves up a cannibal banquet, only to be assassinated at the dining table, yielding the "bloody banquet" of the title. The sole extant text of the play is only about 1900 lines in length, roughly 500 lines shorter than the average for plays of its era; discontinuities in the text suggest that it was edited before publication. The drama's date is uncertain, although its general style and tone place it sometime after 1600.

== Authorship ==
Some seventeenth-century sources point to Thomas Dekker as the "T. D." of the title page. Nineteenth-century critic F. G. Fleay identified T. D. as Thomas Drue on the strength of the common initials – but since virtually nothing is known about Drue (the author of only one acknowledged play, The Duchess of Suffolk), the attribution offered little enlightenment, and left the field open for other candidates. Robert Davenport was also suggested as a possibility.

In 1925, E. H. C. Oliphant first linked the name of Thomas Middleton with the play; he argued that The Bloody Banquet was a Dekker/Middleton collaboration. Further research and the use of stylistic analysis has brought about a consensus that the authors were Dekker and Middleton. David Lake, in his 1975 analysis of attribution problems in the Middleton canon, suggested that "The play is a much-revised one, written originally by Middleton with some help from Dekker about 1600–02" — though he acknowledged this as only one possibility. Macdonald Jackson strengthened the case for Middleton two decades later. More recently, Gary Taylor has included it Middleton's Collected Works (2007), and has argued that the play was originally written by Middleton and Dekker in 1608–09, and then adapted in the 1620s. A 21st-century adaptation is available.

== Characters ==
- The King of Lydia (the Old King)
- Tymethes, the King of Lydia's son
- Lapyrus, the King of Lydia's nephew
- The King of Lycia
- Zantippus, the King of Lycia's son
- Eurymone, the King of Lycia's daughter
- Armatrites, King of Cilicia (the Tyrant)
- Zenarchus, the King of Cilicia's son
- Amphridote, the King of Cilicia's daughter
- Thetis, the King of Cilicia's queen (the Young Queen)
- Thetis' maid
- Mazeres, the King of Cilicia's adviser
- Roxano, Thetis' helper
- Fidelo & Amorpho, the Lydian King's faithful servants
- Sertorio & Lodovico, the Lydian King's unfaithful servants
- The Old Queen of Lydia
- The Old Queen of Lydia's two little children
- Chorus
- The Clown
- Two Shepherds
- Four Servants
- Soldiers

== Synopsis ==
Induction

The play's back story is acted out in pantomime and narrated by the Chorus: After seven long, bloody battles, the King of Lydia and the King of Lycia agreed to a peace treaty. As a pledge of faith, the treaty was sealed by an exchange of hostages. The King of Lydia traded his nephew, Lapyrus, for the King of Lycia's son, Zantippus. Shortly after the exchange, the King of Lycia offered Lapyrus the hand of his beautiful daughter Eurymone if Lapyrus would turn traitor against his uncle. Lapyrus agreed to the deal, married Eurymone, and led an army to attack Lydia. As Lapyrus' army attacked, the King of Lydia sent his son, Tymethes, to enlist the aid of The King of Cilicia. Meanwhile, The Queen of Lydia took her two infant sons and fled to a forest, certain the kingdom would soon come to ruin. Shortly thereafter, the King of Cilicia arrived in Lydia, forced Lapyrus' army to withdraw, and saved the King. However, as the plot unfolds, it turns out that the King of Cilicia had treacherous notions of his own.

=== Act I ===
Scene 1: The presence chamber of the King of Lydia

The King of Cilicia (hereafter referred to as "the Tyrant") enters the presence chamber of the King of Lydia, sits on the throne, and proclaims himself king. The Old King of Lydia protests, but his objections are quickly swept away by the Tyrant, who insists that he will now sit as ruler of Lydia while his son Zenarchus takes over as ruler of Cilicia. Zenarchus kneels and begs his father to act honourably and show pity on the Old King of Lydia, but this petition is quickly countered by objections from the Tyrant's shrewd advisor, Mazeres. Resigning himself to his fate, the Old King of Lydia retires from the court accompanied by two faithful servants, Fidelo and Amorpho. Two other servants, Sertorio and Lodovico, decide to forsake the Old King and enter into the Tyrant's service. Zenarchus begs his father to allow his friend, Tymethes, the Old King's son, to remain at court. He argues that Tymethes has a gentle nature, and would not pose any threat. Mazeres notes that a gesture of kindness toward the Old King's son would be politically astute because it would make the Tyrant look good. The Tyrant agrees to let Tymethes remain at court. Everyone exits except Zenarchus and Tymethes. Zenarchus bemoans the influence Mazeres holds over his father. Tymethes lies down on the ground, certain that he must be dreaming. Zenarchus assures him that he is not. Tymethes says that (despite the loss of the kingdom, his mother's uncertain whereabouts, and his father's banishment) his primary concern is that Zenarchus' sister Amphridote will not dare love him any longer for fear of her father's disapproval. Zenarchus reassures Tymethes that Amphridote's love will certainly remain constant. Amphridote enters. Tymethes asks her if she will still love him now that he is a beggar. Amphridote says she will. Zenarchus praises his sister and vows to return the kingdom to Tymethes after the Tyrant's death. Mazeres enters, unnoticed, and observes the conversation. Tymethes and Amphridote kiss. Mazeres is shocked to see the princess kiss a "beggar." Everyone exits except Mazeres, who soliloquises about his love for Amphridote and his determination to get rid of Tymethes.

Scene 2: A forest

Disguised as a beggar, the Old Queen of Lydia bemoans her fate and wonders aloud what will become of her two infant sons.

Scene 3: Another part of the forest

Lapyrus enters, disguised with a false beard. He curses himself for betraying his king and country. As he prepares to commit suicide, the Old Queen enters pursued by a pair of soldiers intent on raping her. Lapyrus chases the soldiers away. The Old Queen thanks him and tells him her story. He complains bitterly about her nephew, the "traitorous villain" Lapyrus. Lapyrus is tormented to see the Old Queen (his aunt) in such miserable straits. Keeping his identity secret, he tells her that he has recently seen Lapyrus in the forest. Assuring the Old Queen that Lapyrus is truly penitent, he asks her what she would do if she should happen to cross paths with her traitorous nephew. The Old Queen says she would kill him. Lapyrus gives the Old Queen his sword, kneels, removes his false beard, and encourages her to take his life. The Old Queen decides to pardon Lapyrus, but only on the condition that he provide for her and her children. Lapyrus agrees to become the Old Queen's provider.

Scene 4: Outside the Young Queen's rooms

Tymethes is quite moody because of his love for Amphridote. To cheer him up, Zenarchus arranges to meet his stepmother, the Queen, a beautiful young woman whom the Tyrant keeps imprisoned under strict supervision. Tymethes is immediately struck by the Young Queen's beauty. The Young Queen, in turn, falls in love with Tymethes at first sight. Tymethes flirts with the Young Queen by raising a toast in her honour. She refrains from returning the gesture for fear of revealing her true feelings. Tymethes toasts her again, and once again, the Young Queen declines to respond in kind. Erroneously assuming that he has been snubbed because of his lower social status, Tymethes storms off without a word. Zenarchus follows. Left alone, the Young Queen soliloquises about her love for Tymethes. She cautions herself to proceed carefully, but notes that she does not have to worry too much about the attendants who watch over her because they can be bribed with ease. The Tyrant enters, angry to find that his wife is not being watched by her attendants. After noting the importance of keeping women under strict observance, he greets his wife warmly and anticipates the sexual pleasure they will share that night. The Young Queen's attendant, Roxano, enters. The Tyrant and the Young Queen kiss and exit together. In a soliloquy brimming with sexual innuendo, Roxano says that he can tell from the Young Queen's face that she intends to deceive her husband. Noting that women desire sex above all else, he says that he would happily provide her with "service" if the chance should arise. The Young Queen enters. In an aside, she notes that her desire for Tymethes has become uncontrollable. Roxano asks the cause of her dissatisfaction. The Young Queen tells him about her infatuation. Roxano agrees to help the Young Queen arrange a rendezvous with Tymethes. The Young Queen insists that Tymethes must lie with her without knowing her true identity, a measure necessary to guard against the Tyrant's obsessive jealousy. After worrying about what might happen if her deception should be discovered, the Young Queen swoons. Roxano catches her in his arms. When she awakens, Roxano tells her that he will make all of the arrangements right away: The Young Queen will sleep with Tymethes, but Tymethes will not know her in the morning. The Young Queen thanks Roxano and gives him some gold.

=== Act II ===
Scene 1: Outside a sheepcote; a fruit tree beside a pit

In this short comic interlude, a Clown and two Shepherds lie boughs over an open pit to trap wolves. In a series of witty exchanges, the Clown says there are four types of wolves 1) court wolves (the elites), 2) country wolves (farmers), 3) city wolves (urbanites), and 4) sea wolves (sailors).

Scene 2: Outside a sheepcote; a fruit tree beside a pit

Lapyrus enters complaining about the cruelty of Nature and the difficulty of finding food. Approaching the tree to pick some fruit, he falls in the pit and screams for help. The Clown enters and asks his name. When Lapyrus identifies himself, the Clown calls him a traitorous villain, replaces the boughs covering the pit, and exits.

Scene 3: The Lydian Castle; outdoors

Tymethes, Amphridote and Zenarchus notice that they are being observed by Mazeres (the Tyrant's advisor). Tymethes kisses Amphridote to make Mazeres jealous. Enraged, Mazeres vows to get rid of Tymethes and exits. Roxano enters disguised as a beggar. He pulls Tymethes aside and tells him that a beautiful young lady wants to sleep with him, but Tymethes cannot know her name. They make arrangements for to meet at a lodge at five pm the next day.

Scene 4: Outside a sheepcote; a fruit tree beside a pit

The Old King of Lydia enters bemoaning the loss of his wife. He is accompanied by his servants, Fidelio and Amorpho. Lapyrus calls out for help from the pit. Fidelio and Amorpho pull Lapyrus out of the pit. The Old King immediately (and rather unexpectedly) forgives Lapyrus on the spot. Lapyrus tells The Old King that the Old Queen is safe, and promises to re-unite the royal pair immediately.

Scene 5: Pantomime

This scene is acted out in pantomime and narrated by the Chorus: One of the Old Queen's infant sons died of hunger while the Old Queen was waiting for Lapyrus to bring back some food. While the Old Queen was burying her dead baby, some shepherds came along and rescued the remaining child from certain starvation. The Old Queen went off with them, posing as the baby's wet-nurse. When Lapyrus and the Old King returned to find the Old Queen gone, they assumed she had died, and left in a state of extreme grief.

=== Act III ===
Scene 1: The lodge where Tymethes is supposed to meet Roxano

Roxano enters, enviously contemplating Tymethes' date with the Young Queen: "I that could never aspire above a dairy wench, the very cream of my fortunes—that he should bathe in nectar, and I most unfortunate in buttermilk, this is good dealing now, is't?" Mazeres enters and offers Roxano a healthy sum of gold if he will kill Tymethes. Roxano accepts the offer. Tymethes enters. Mazeres exits. Roxano re-assumes his "beggar" disguise and tells Tymethes that he must wear a hood over his head before he can be brought to the "anonymous young lady." Tymethes agrees to don the hood, and Roxano leads him off-stage.

Scene 2: A room in the lodge

The Young Queen forces her servants to take an oath of secrecy and loyalty and then gives them documents detailing the roles they must play in facilitating her secret date with Tymethes.

Scene 3: A banqueting room in the lodge

Roxano leads Tymethes (still hooded) into a richly decorated banquet hall. Tymethes' hood is removed. He is amazed at the extravagance of his surroundings. The Young Queen's servants, all wearing masks, attend on him. Disguised as one of the masked servants, Mazeres pours Tymethes some poisoned wine. Tymethes spills the wine by mistake. The Young Queen enters, masked and wearing her nightgown. Tymethes is very pleased. The Young Queen exits. Roxano gives Tymethes a nightshirt and tells him there are five hundred gold crowns in the sleeve—advance payment for his "services". In addition to the crowns, Tymethes finds a note from the Young Queen in the sleeve. In the note, she promises him a night of pleasure, but begs him to keep their encounter a safely guarded secret. Tymethes exits to meet his "lady". Roxano follows. Left alone on stage, Mazeres removes his mask. Frustrated that his attempt at murder was foiled, he makes plans to ruin Tymethes by telling the Tyrant about his encounter with the Young Queen.

=== Act IV ===
Scene 1: A room in the castle

Tymethes shows Zenarchus a jewel he stole during his encounter with the mysterious young "lady". He says he hopes to use the jewel to gain knowledge of the "lady's" identity. Mazeres and the Tyrant enter unnoticed and observe from a corner. Amphridote enters and kisses Tymethes. The Tyrant is enraged. Amphridote notices the jewel stolen from the "lady" and asks Tymethes to give it to her as present. Tymethes gives it to her, but makes her promise to keep it hidden. They kiss. Zenarchus and Amphridote exit. The Tyrant vows to put an end to his daughter's relationship and exits with Mazeres following. Alone on stage, Tymethes says he is determined to discover the mysterious "lady's" identity. Roxano and Mazeres enter unnoticed and observe Tymethes. At Mazeres' urging, Roxano approaches Tymethes and offers to arrange another meeting with the "lady." Tymethes readily accepts the offer. They agree to meet at the lodge again soon.

Scene 2: Another room in the castle

The Tyrant summons Amphridote and scolds her for carrying on with a "beggar" (Tymethes). He demands that she turn over any gifts that Tymethes may have given her. Amphridote gives him the jewel Tymethes stole from the Young Queen. The Tyrant recognises the jewel immediately and asks Mazeres how it could have fallen into Tymethes' hands. Mazeres tells the Tyrant everything about the Young Queen's secret meeting with Tymethes at the lodge. The Tyrant falls into a jealous rage. Laying plans to catch the Young Queen red-handed, he tells his servant to spread a rumour that he has travelled far away from the castle. Everyone exits except Amphridote. She is shocked at the news of Tymethes' philandering. Mazeres enters. Disgusted with Tymethes, Amphridote tells Mazeres that she has decided to love him instead. Mazeres is pleased.

Scene 3: The Young Queen's bedchamber

Roxano leads Tymethes (hooded once again) into the Young Queen's bedchamber. Tymethes' hood is removed and Roxano exits. Tymethes wakes the Young Queen up. She is upset when she sees him, certain that his indiscretion will be the cause of their ruin. When Tymethes protests, she tells him that if he kneels and spends an hour in repentant prayer, she will spend the night with him once again. Tymethes kneels to pray. The Young Queen exits, returns with two pistols, and shoots Tymethes dead. The Tyrant enters. The Young Queen tells him that she was forced to shoot Tymethes when he broke into her room and tried to rape her. The Tyrant scoffs at this story. He tells her that he knows everything about her relationship with Tymethes and produces the stolen jewel as proof. Mazeres enters disguised as Roxano and recounts the details of The Young Queen's secret meeting with Tymethes at the lodge. The Young Queen is shocked at "Roxano's" betrayal. Comparing the Young Queen to a hunter who has killed a deer, the Tyrant orders his servants to butcher Tymethes' body and prepare it for a feast. He tells the Young Queen that she will be forced to eat her former lover as punishment for her deception. The Young Queen is distraught. The Tyrant exits. Mazeres enters and asks the Young Queen why she is upset. The Young Queen tells him that she has been betrayed by a servant. Mazeres asks her to name the traitorous servant so he can help her get revenge. At that moment, Roxano enters. The Young Queen identifies Roxano as the traitor. Mazeres rushes at Roxano with a sword and kills him. The Tyrant enters with servants carrying Tymethes' limbs. The limbs are strung up in the Young Queen's room. The Tyrant tells the Young Queen that she will receive nothing to eat until she has finished consuming Tymethes' remains.

=== Act V ===
Scene 1: A room in the castle; Tymethes' butchered limbs hanging in display

Zenarchus views Tymethes' butchered limbs and mourns bitterly. The Tyrant enters and asks Zenarchus if he is pleased that his villainous friend has been discovered and killed. Zenarchus coyly replies that he would be happier if Tymethes had been exposed sooner. He blames Mazeres for keeping Tymethes' crimes a secret rather than reporting them right away. Persuaded by his son's accusations, the Tyrant summons Mazeres and orders him executed. Mazeres is dragged off stage in astonishment. The Tyrant exits. Zenarchus expresses satisfaction that his friend's death has been avenged. Amphridote enters, shocked by the news of Mazeres' imminent execution (she pledged her love to Mazeres in 4.2). She vows to kill the person responsible for arranging Mazeres' death. Assuming that Amphridote will be pleased to hear that Tymethes' death has been avenged, Zenarchus tells her how he facilitated Mazeres' execution. He orders some wine for a toast. Amphridote secretly poisons the wine before it is poured. They both drink the poisoned wine. Amphridote tells her brother that she hates him for killing Mazeres and dies. Zenarchus says that women who fall in love to easily can never be virtuous. He dies as well. Thunder rumbles and lightning strikes. The Tyrant enters and says that the bad weather is not a good sign. He finds the bodies of his dead daughter and son, shrieks in horror, and orders his servants to take the corpses away. The Old King, Lapyrus, Sertorio and Lodovico enter, all disguised as pilgrims seeking refuge from the storm. They observe Tymethes' butchered limbs with horror and note that the castle is not well-guarded. The Tyrant greets the "pilgrims" warmly and orders his servants to bring dinner. A banquet is brought in, and a separate table is set aside for the Young Queen. The Tyrant encourages the "pilgrims" to ignore the butchered limbs strung up around them. The Young Queen enters and sits at her table. A plate of human flesh and a bloody skull are set in front of her. She eats the flesh and drinks blood out of the skull. The "pilgrims" are astounded. The Tyrant explains that the Young Queen is being forced to eat her former lover as punishment for her betrayal. Fidelo slips out of the room unnoticed. The Old King asks the name of the man being eaten. The Tyrant tells him that it is Tymethes, son of the Old King of Lydia. Fidelo re-enters and tells the Old King that the castle guards have been seized. The Old King begs the Tyrant to have mercy on the Young Queen. The Tyrant refuses: "Never, our vow's irrevocable, never. The lecher must be swallowed rib by rib. His flesh is sweet; it melts, and goes down merrily." At that moment, the pilgrims cast off their disguises and raise their swords. The Tyrant is shocked to see that Lapyrus has double-crossed him. Before he can be seized, the Tyrant kills the Young Queen and mocks his attackers. The Old King and company rush at the Tyrant with their swords. The Tyrant dies. The Old King is restored to his throne. The Old Queen enters, disguised as a humble nursemaid. The Old King asks her name, and she removes her disguise. The Old King rejoices and orders the burial of Tymethes' remains.
