= Aharon Ibn Hayyim =

Moroccan biblical and Talmudic commentator

Aharon Ibn Hayyim (Hebrew: אהרן אבן חיים 1545–1632) was a biblical and Talmudic commentator. Born in Fez, Morocco, he served on the bet din and studied at the yeshivot of his father, Vidal ha-Zarefati and Joseph Almosnino. In 1606 he left Fez for Egypt, and made his way to Venice in 1608 where he printed his numerous manuscripts. While in Venice, Ibn Hayyim gave lectures in several congregations, and was well known by famous rabbis at the time. He died in Jerusalem in 1632, and is well known for his publications Leb Aharon, Korban Aharon (commentary on the Sifra), and Middot Aharon.

== Leb Aharon ==
Leb Aharon (Aaron's Heart) is a commentary on Joshua and the Judges, and contains both simple explanations of the words (peshat), as well as a more in depth analysis of the text at large (derush). While Ibn Hayyim wrote commentaries to the Mekhilta, Sifrei, Pentateuch, Prophets, and Song of Songs, Leb Aharon was his only commentary of this type to be published.

== Middot Aharon ==
Middot Aharon (Aaron's Rules) is Aharon ibn Hayyim's most well-known publication, and serves as one of the only compositions that adequately discusses the thirteen hermeneutic principles as laid out by R. Ishmael. This work focuses on the development and application of the thirteen hermeneutical principles, and was largely responsible for the Sifra becoming a subject of study. Ibn Hayyim's main objective is to search for and explain the plain meaning of the text, and seeks to interpret the literal meaning, despite his often-wordy explanations.

== Korban Aharon ==
Korban Aharon (Aaron's Offering) is a lengthy commentary on Sifra, printed in Venice from 1609 to 1611 (reprinted Jerusalem 1970). This commentary is significant because Aharon Ibn Hayyim inserted the so-called Mekhilta de Arayot (Weiss Edition 91c-93b) into the Sifra and it was printed in Weiss' edition. The manuscript tradition (Vatican 66) has inserted this piece from another source. Aharon Ibn Hayyim's commentary also discusses the relevant parallel texts from rabbinical literature.
