= Heinrich Brewer =

German historian

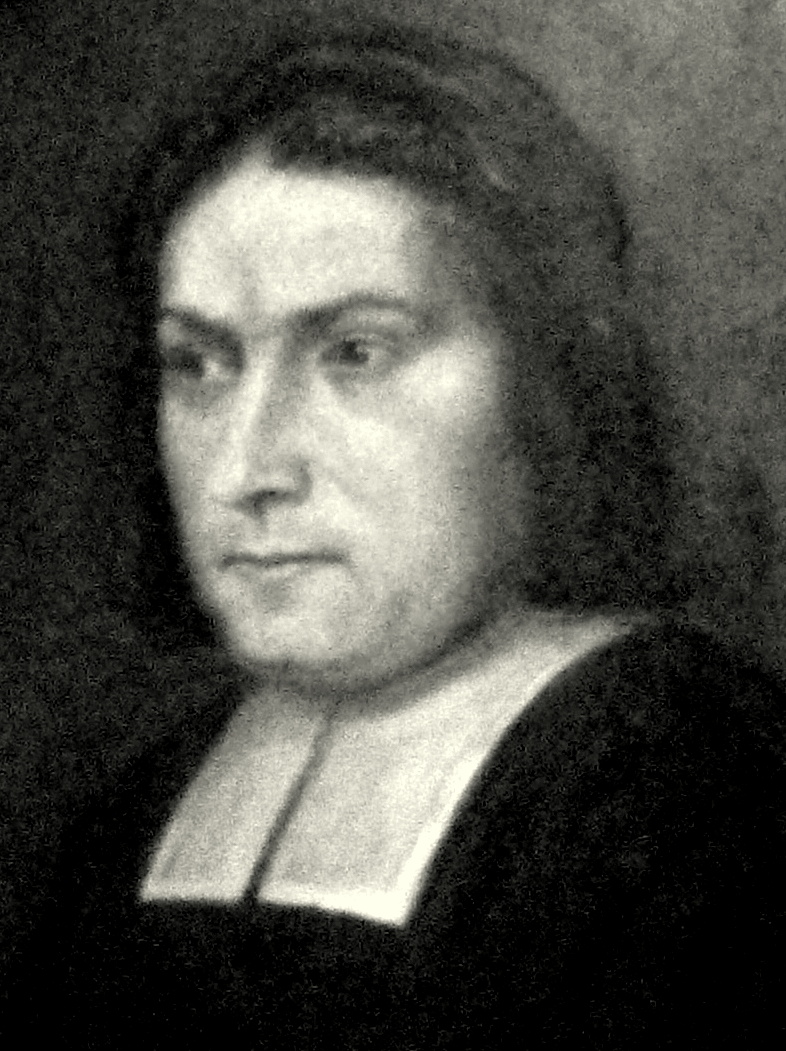
Heinrich Brewer

Heinrich Brewer (September 6, 1640 in Puffendorf, Germany – c. 1713 in Puffendorf) was a German Roman Catholic priest and historian.

== Biography ==
Brewer was educated at the Gymnasium Tricoronatum in Cologne. He was ordained a priest in 1664. After this he was for a time a private tutor at Cologne, then curate of the cathedral at Bonn. He continued his studies while filling these positions and in 1667 was made lecturer on theology at the University of Cologne. From 1669 to 1682 he was rector of a convent of nuns at Cologne, a position which gave him the leisure to carry on his historical studies. In 1682 he became parish priest of the church of St. Jacob at Aachen. After twenty-nine years in Aachen he resigned his pastorate in 1712 and returned to his quiet native town.

== Works ==
Brewer's most important work is: Historica rerum notabiliorum ubique paene terrarum gestarum enarratio breviter et succinete pro historiae universalis Brachelio-Thuldenanae continuatione adornata (Cologne, 1672–75, two volumes). Shortly after this he published a revised edition of the Historia Universalis Brachelio-Thuldenanae in eight volumes. Brewer now received the title of Imperial Historiographer. The honour was fitly bestowed, for Brewer was one of the few historians of the time who sought out original sources and made full use of them. He added to each volume copies of important official documents, besides making skillful use of pictures and maps.

A much discussed question of the time was the identity of the author of The Imitation of Christ. Brewer made an independent investigation and tried to prove that Thomas à Kempis was the author in a work titled Thomae à Kempis biographia (Cologne, 1681). Even from the modern point of view this work is a very creditable one. A publication of less importance and one which is at times strongly marked by local feeling is titled Der in der Reliquienverehrung rechtschaffen catholisch und wahraftig grosser Kayser Karl bey gewohnlicher Eroffnung der Aachischen Schatzkammer Heyligthumbs (Aachen, 1685).

During his residence at Bonn, Brewer published, in 1668, a poem of slight poetic value titled "Crinitum poli Sidus."
