= 1634 in literature =

List of years in literature	(table)
- … 1624; 1625; 1626; 1627; 1628; 1629; 1630; 1631; 1632; 1633; 1634; 1635; 1636; 1637; 1638; 1639; 1640; 1641; 1642; 1643; 1644 …
- Art; Archaeology; Architecture; Literature; Music; Philosophy; Science; +...

This article contains information about the literary events and publications of 1634.

== Events ==
- January 1 – The King's Men perform Cymbeline at the court of King Charles I of England.
- January 22 – The King's Men perform Davenant's The Wits at the Blackfriars Theatre in the City of London.
- February 3 – James Shirley's spectacular masque The Triumph of Peace is staged in London. A second performance takes place on February 13.
- February 6 – Shirley's play The Gamester is performed at court.
- February 18 – Thomas Carew's masque Coelum Britannicum is staged at Whitehall Palace.
- March – The Académie française begins life as a project sponsored by Cardinal Richelieu.
- February 29 – Under pressure from the Duke de Medinaceli, Francisco de Quevedo marries Doña Esperanza de Aragón.
- April
  - The first Théâtre du Marais is founded at a tennis court in Paris.
  - The first Oberammergau Passion Play is performed in Bavaria.
- April 7 – The King's Men perform Chapman's Bussy D'Ambois at court.
- April 8 – The tragicomedy The Two Noble Kinsmen (first performed about 1614) is attributed in the Stationers' Register in London to the late John Fletcher and William Shakespeare; it is published for the first time later in the year.
- May 1 – Lodowick Carlell's play The Spartan Lady is performed, but has since been lost.
- May 7 – William Prynne is sentenced by the Star Chamber in England to a £5,000 fine, life imprisonment, pillorying and clipping of his ears when his Histriomastix (published 1632) is viewed as an attack on King Charles I of England and Queen Henrietta Maria.
- May 21 – A play called Lisander and Callista that is performed is probably a version of the Fletcher/Massinger collaboration The Lovers' Progress.
- July 30 – Ben Jonson's final masque, Love's Welcome at Bolsover, is performed at Bolsover Castle in the East Midlands of England.
- unknown date – The first part of Giambattista Basile's fairy tale collection The Pentamerone (Neapolitan: Lo cunto de li cunti overo lo trattenemiento de peccerille, "The Tale of Tales, or Entertainment for Little Ones") is published posthumously by his sister Adriana in Naples under the pseudonym Gian Alesio Abbatutis, including Cenerentola, an early version of Cinderella.

== New books ==
=== Prose ===
- Moses Amyraut – Traité de la predestination (Treatise on predestination)
- Alonso de Castillo Solórzano – La Niña de los embustes, Teresa de Manzanares
- Alonso Jerónimo de Salas Barbadillo – El Curioso y fabio Alexandro
- Francisco de Quevedo
  - La cuna y la sepultura (The cradle and the sepulchre) (22 February)
  - Translation of La introducción a la vida devota (The introduction to a life of devotion) of Francis of Sales
- Thomas Herbert – Some Yeares Travels into Divers Parts of Asia and Afrique
- Johannes Kepler (died 1630) – Somnium (written 1608)
- Thomas Muffet (died 1604; comp.) – Insectorum sive Minimorum Animalium Theatrum
- John Pell – Astronomical History of Observations of Heavenly Motions and Appearances

=== Children ===
- Anonymous – Pentamerone (Neapolitan folk tales for young children)

=== Drama ===
- Juan Ruiz de Alarcón – La verdad sospechosa (published)
- Richard Brome and Thomas Heywood – The Late Lancashire Witches
- William Davenant
  - The Wits
  - Love and Honour, also known as The Courage of Love
  - The Temple of Love (masque)
- Lope de Vega – Las bizarrías de Belisa
- John Ford (and Thomas Dekker?) – Perkin Warbeck published
- Thomas Heywood – A Maidenhead Well Lost published
- Ben Jonson – Love's Welcome at Bolsover
- John Milton – Comus (masque)
- Thomas Nabbes – Tottenham Court
- James Shirley
  - The Example
  - The Opportunity
  - The Triumph of Peace (masque)

=== Poetry ===
- Richard Crashaw – Epigrammatum sacrorum liber ("A Book of Sacred Epigrams", in Latin)
- Lope de Vega
  - La Gatomaquia ("The catfight")
  - Rimas humanas y divinas del licenciado Tomé de Burguillos
- William Habington – Castara (published anonymously)
- Johann von Rist – Musa Teutonica

== Births ==
- January 16 – Dorothe Engelbretsdotter, Norwegian poet (died 1716)
- March 18 – Madame de la Fayette, French novelist (died 1693)
- April 6 – Pierre Thomas, French scholar and memoirist (died 1698)
- July 14 – Pasquier Quesnel, French theologian (died 1719)
- December 15 – Thomas Hansen Kingo, Danish poet, hymnist and bishop (died 1703)

== Deaths ==
- May 12 – George Chapman, English dramatist, poet and translator (born c. 1559)
- June 25 – John Marston, English dramatist (born 1576)
- August 9 – William Noy, English jurist and legal writer (born 1577)
- August 23 (bur.) – Tomos Prys, Welsh-language poet (born c. 1564)
- December 22 – Matthew Rader, Tyrolean philologist and historian (born 1561)
