= Joseph Rutter =

17th-century English poet and dramatist

Joseph Rutter (fl. 1635) was an English poet and translator.

== Life ==
Rutter belonged to the Tribe of Ben, the literary group around Ben Jonson who had received commendatory verse from Jonson. Rutter appears to have lived with Sir Kenelm Digby for a time, after the death of Lady Venetia Digby in 1633. He was tutor to the sons of Edward Sackville, 4th Earl of Dorset, Richard and Edward (died 1645).

== Works ==
In 1635 Rutter published The Shepheard's Holy Day. A Pastorall Tragi Comœdie Acted before both their Majesties at White Hall. With an Elegie on the most noble lady Venetia Digby, London, 1635. Ben Jonson wrote it a preface, addressed "to my deare sonne and right learned friend", and another was by Thomas May.

Rutter has an elegy on Ben Jonson in Jonsonus Virbius, London, 1638. For the Earl of Dorset, Rutter translated from Corneille The Cid. Part of the translation, which is in blank verse, is said to have been the work of his pupils. The second part was published at the king's command in 1640, and both were republished at London, 1650.
