= Histriomastix =

1632 critique by William Prynne

Histriomastix: The Player's Scourge, or Actor's Tragedy published in 1632 is a critique of professional theatre and actors, written by the Puritan author and controversialist William Prynne.

== Publication ==
While the publishing history of the work is not absolutely clear, Histriomastix was published late in 1632 by the bookseller Michael Sparke. It had been in preparation by its author for almost ten years before its printing.

The title page of the first edition is erroneously dated 1633; as a result many sources cite this as the date of publication. Depositions given in connection with Prynne's trial indicate that the actual writing of the text was accomplished between spring 1631 and mid-to-late 1632.

== Themes ==
Histriomastix represents the culmination of the Puritan attack on the English Renaissance theatre and celebrations such as Christmas, as noted in the following: "Our Christmas lords of misrule, together with dancing, masks, mummeries, state players, and such other Christmas disorders, now in use with Christians, were derived from these Roman Saturnalia and Bacchanalian festivals, which should cause all pious Christians eternally to abominate them."

Running to over a thousand pages, and with a main title of 43 lines, Histriomastix marshals a multitude of ancient and medieval authorities against the "sin" of dramatic performance. The book condemns most aspects of dramatic performance in its era, from the practice of boy actors representing women to the "obscene lascivious love songs, most melodiously chanted out upon the stage...."

== Theological and political context ==
Prynne's book was not by any means the first such attack on the stage, though it certainly was the longest. Its Puritan theology was in any case unwelcome to the civil authorities, led by Attorney General William Noy.

== Trial and sentence ==
Prynne was imprisoned in 1633 but not tried until 1634, at which time he had to appear before the Star Chamber on a charge of seditious libel. Prosecuted by the barrister William Hudson on behalf of Noy, he was defended by Edward Atkyns and John Herne. Sentence on Prynne was pronounced by Lord Cottington, and the other judges (Sir John Coke, Robert Heath, the Earl of Pembroke, and Sir Thomas Richardson) concurred.

At Prynne's trial, some fifty separate and allegedly seditious excerpts from the book were quoted; but the one that has attracted most attention from subsequent critics is Prynne's attack on women actors as "notorious whores." Though Prynne's text made clear he was referring to French actresses who had recently performed at Blackfriars, the remark was, at the time, taken as a direct reference to Queen Henrietta Maria. The Queen had had a speaking role in Walter Montagu's masque The Shepherd's Paradise, which was staged on January 9, 1633, most likely after Prynne's book was in print, but she had also appeared and danced in two earlier masques and performed a spoken part in French in a private performance of Honorat de Racan's pastoral, Artenice, in 1626.

In the end, Prynne was sentenced to be pilloried twice, fined £5,000, and imprisoned for life. In addition, his book was to be burned by the common hangman, and he was expelled from his university, prohibited from practicing law, and mutilated by the severance of his ears. During his imprisonment, Prynne continued to produce anonymous pamphlets attacking leaders of the Anglican Church, which induced the authorities, in 1637, to inflict further mutilation: first, the surviving stumps of his severed ears were cut off, and, second, his cheeks were branded with the letters “S.L.” The letters represented the words “Seditious Libeler,” but since his biting words sometimes attacked Archbishop Laud, Prynne preferred to render them as “Stigmata Laudis,” or, “the marks of Laud.”

== Purported retraction ==
Not long before the execution of Charles I, which occurred on 30 January 1649, a tract began to circulate, datelined "London, printed in the year 1649," and bearing the title Mr. William Prynn His Defence of Stage Plays in a Retractation of a former Book of his called Histrio-Mastix. Written in Prynne’s style and under his name, the text purported to be a retraction of the sentiments expressed in Histriomastix. Prynne responded with a “posting-bill,” or flyer, of his own under the title “Vindication,” which bore the date January 10, 1648, oddly a full year before the publication of the alleged retraction. In 1825, the antiquarian E. W. Brayley undertook to expose the “retraction” as a hoax in a slim volume entitled An Enquiry into the Genuineness of Prynne’s “Defense of Stage Plays,” and his argument addresses, in part, the anomaly of the dates by explaining the slow acceptance of the calendar reform of 1582.

== Aftermath ==
Prynne was released from prison during the Long Parliament. The notorious book was never fully suppressed; however, in the next generation, even King Charles II had a copy in his library.

== See also ==
- -mastix
