= Jean Mairet =

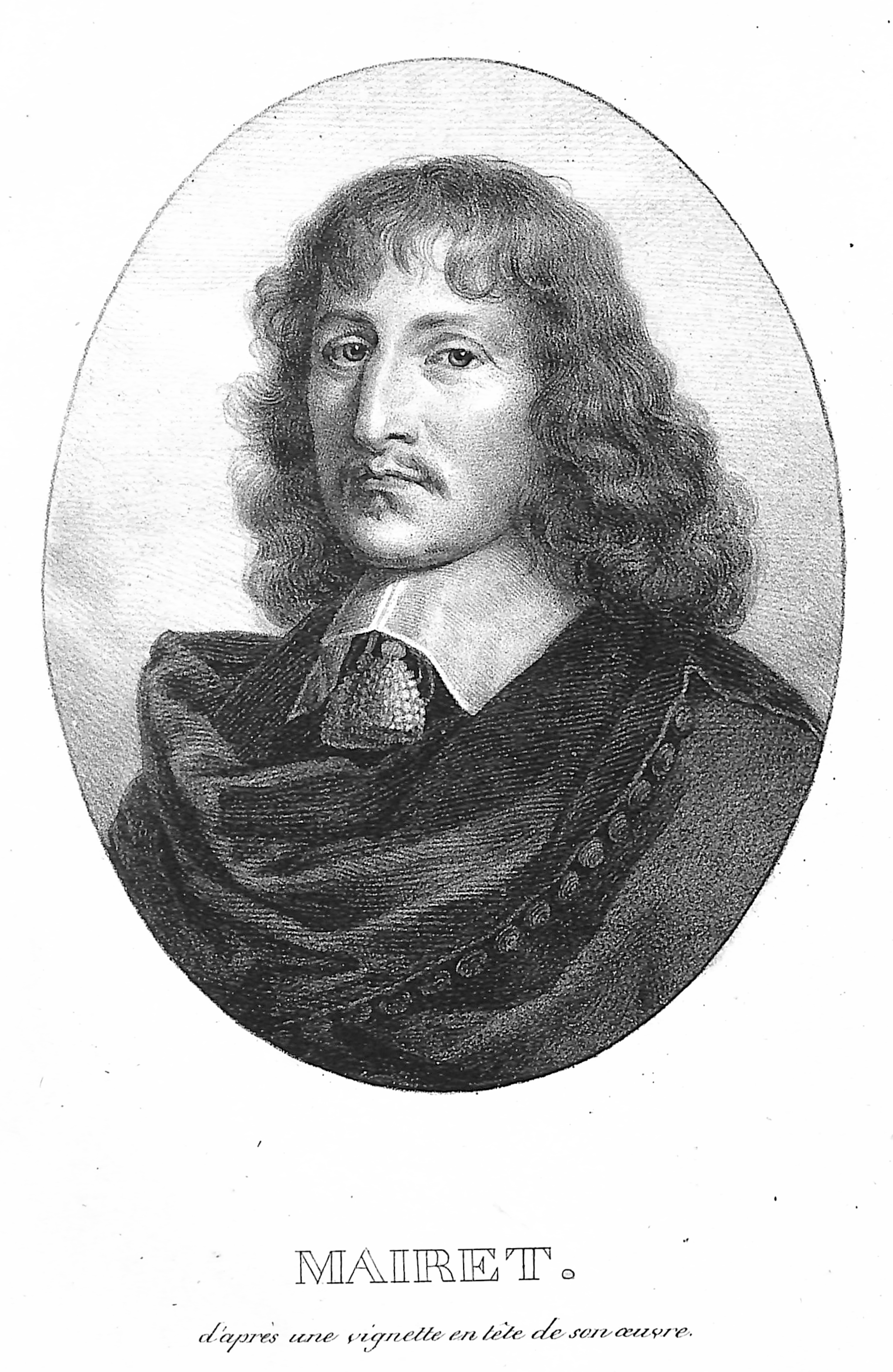
- Born: 10 May 1604; Besançon, County of Burgundy, Holy Roman Empire
- Died: 31 January 1686 (aged 81); Besançon
- Education: Collège des Grassins

Jean (de) Mairet (10 May 1604 – 31 January 1686) was a classical French dramatist who wrote both tragedies and comedies.

== Life ==
He was born at Besançon (then part of the Free County of Burgundy under the Holy Roman Empire), and went to Paris to study at the Collège des Grassins about 1625. In that year he produced his first piece Chryséide et Arimand. In 1634 he produced his masterpiece, Sophonisbe, which marks, in its observance of the rules, the first to be staged of the classical French tragedies. He also introduced to French drama the three classical unities of time, action and place, after a misreading of Aristotle's Poetics.

Mairet was one of the bitterest assailants of Corneille in the controversy over the violation of the classical unities in Corneille's play Le Cid. He produced several pamphlets against Corneille, who responded more than once, most famously with his Advertissement au Besançonnois Mairet (1637). The personal intervention of Cardinal Richelieu was eventually required to calm the furore in the theatres. It was perhaps his jealousy of the successful Corneille, together with the deaths of his aristocratic patrons, first the duc de Montmorency (1632) and then François de Faudoas, comte de Belin, that made Mairet give up writing for the stage.

He was appointed in 1648 official representative of his home country, the county of Burgundy, which allowed him to stay in Paris, but in 1653 he was banished by Cardinal Mazarin. He was subsequently allowed to return, but in 1668 he retired to Besançon, and subsequently rarely left.

== Other plays ==
- La Sylvie, a pastoral tragi-comedy (1626)
- La Silvanire, ou la Morte-vive, with an elaborate preface on the observance of the unities (1631)
- Les Galanteries du duc d'Ossonne, comedy (1632)
- La Virginie, tragi-comedy (1633)
- Le Marc-Antoine, ou la Cléopâtre, tragedy (1635)
- L'illustre corsaire, tragi-comedy (1636)
- Le Grand et dernier Solyman, tragedy (1637)
- L’Illustre corsaire, tragi-comedy (1640)
- Le Roland furieux, tragi-comedy (1641)
- L’Athénaïs, tragi-comedy (1642)
- La Sidonie, tragi-comedy (1643)

== Bibliography ==
- Bizos, Gaston (1877). Étude sur la vie et les œuvres de Jean de Mairet. Paris: Ernest Thorin.
