= 1639 in literature =

List of years in literature	(table)
- … 1629; 1630; 1631; 1632; 1633; 1634; 1635; 1636; 1637; 1638; 1639; 1640; 1641; 1642; 1643; 1644; 1645; 1646; 1647; 1648; 1649 …
- Art; Archaeology; Architecture; Literature; Music; Philosophy; Science; +...

This article contains information about the literary events and publications of 1639.

== Events ==
- c. January – The first printing press in British North America is launched in Cambridge, Massachusetts by Stephen Daye.
- February 14 – French writers Jacques Esprit and François de La Mothe Le Vayer are elected to the Académie française.
- May 21 – The King's Men act John Fletcher's The Mad Lover in London.
- December – Blaise Pascal's family move to Rouen.
- December 7 – Francisco de Quevedo is arrested and imprisoned at León, Spain.
- unknown dates
  - Simon Dach becomes professor of poetry at the University of Königsberg.
  - Archbishop William Laud donates the manuscript of the Peterborough Chronicle to the Bodleian Library in Oxford.
  - Thomas Heywood writes Londini Status Pacatus, the Lord Mayor of the City of London's annual pageant. It will be the last such in London for 15 years, due to the English Civil War, but will resume under the Commonwealth.

== New books ==
=== Prose ===
- Jean du Vergier de Hauranne – Théologie familière, ou Instruction de ce que le Chrétien doit croire et faire en cette vie pour être sauvé
- Francisco de Quevedo – La isla de los monopantos
- Jan Marek Marci – De proportione motus seu regula sphygmica
- Friedrich Spanheim – Commentaire historique de la vie et de la mort de . . Christofle Vicomte de Dohna
- Henry Spelman (ed.) – Concilia, Decreta, Leges, Constitutiones in re Ecclesiarum Orbis Britannici (3 vols, containing many forgeries)

=== Drama ===
- Lodowick Carlell – Arviragus and Philicia, Parts 1 and 2 (published)
- George Chapman and James Shirley – The Tragedy of Chabot (published)
- Aston Cockayne – A Masque at Bretbie
- Pierre Corneille – L'Illusion comique, (published)
- T. D. (authorship disputed) – The Bloody Banquet (published)
- William Davenant – The Spanish Lovers
- Robert Davenport – A New Trick to Cheat the Devil (published)
- John Fletcher (posthumously)
  - Monsieur Thomas (published)
  - Wit Without Money (published)
- Henry Glapthorne
  - Argalus and Parthenia (published)
  - Albertus Wallenstein (published)
- Sir William Lower – The Phoenix in Her Flames
- Philip Massinger – The Unnatural Combat published
- Jasper Mayne – The City Match
- James Shirley
  - The Politician (performed)
  - The Ball
  - The Maid's Revenge
  - The Changes, or Love in a Maze (published)
- Sir John Suckling – Brennoralt, or the Discontented Colonel

=== Poetry ===
- Richard Corbet – Certain Elegant Poems
- John Clarke – Paroemiologia ("Early to bed and early to rise...")
- Henry Glapthorne – Poems, including a series addressed to "Lucinda"
- Francis Quarles – Memorials Upon the Death of Sir Robert Quarles, Knight

== Births ==
- February 6 – Daniel Georg Morhof, German critic (died 1691)
- December 22 – Jean Racine, French dramatist (died 1699)
- unknown dates
  - Thomas Ellwood, English religious writer (died 1713)
  - César Vichard de Saint-Réal, French novelist (died 1692)
- probable – Charles Sedley, English wit and dramatist (died 1701)

== Deaths ==
- January – Shackerley Marmion, English dramatist (born 1603)
- January 23 – Francisco Maldonado de Silva, Argentinian poet (burned at stake, born 1592)
- May 21 – Tommaso Campanella, Italian poet and theologian (born 1568)
- August 4 – Juan Ruiz de Alarcón, New Spanish dramatist (born c. 1581)
- August 20 – Martin Opitz von Boberfeld, German poet (born 1597)
- October – Elizabeth Cary, Viscountess Falkland, English poet, translator and dramatist (born 1585)
- November 26 – John Spottiswoode, Scottish historian (born 1565)
- Possible date – John Ford, English dramatist and poet (born 1586)
