= Thomas Cotes =

English printer (died 1641)

- Died: 1641
- Occupation: Printer

Thomas Cotes (died 1641) was a London printer of the Jacobean and Caroline eras, best remembered for printing the Second Folio edition of Shakespeare's plays in 1632.

== Life and work ==
Thomas Cotes became a "freeman" (a full member) of the Stationers Company on 6 January 1606; he was a former apprentice of William Jaggard, who would print the First Folio with his son Isaac. Cotes ran his own printing shop from 1620 to 1641; from 1635 on, he was in partnership with his brother Richard Cotes (died 1653). Their shop was in the Barbican in Aldersgate Street. (Their sister Jane was married to another printer, Robert Ibbitson.) On 19 June 1627, Thomas Cotes acquired the business and copyrights of Isaac Jaggard, son and heir of William Jaggard, from Jaggard's widow Dorothy.

A royal decree of 1637 named Thomas Cotes one of the twenty Master Printers of the Stationers Company.

== Drama ==
In his substantial career, Cotes was a major producer of play texts of English Renaissance drama. He printed the first quarto of The Two Noble Kinsmen (1634) for publisher John Waterson, and the second edition of Fletcher's The Faithful Shepherdess (1629) for Richard Meighen, who was one of the partners in the Second Folio syndicate. He printed more than a dozen plays for Andrew Crooke and William Cooke, including many by James Shirley; he printed Pathomachia for Francis Constable. His quartos of Pericles, Prince of Tyre (1635) and The Bloody Banquet (1639) were rare instances in which Cotes functioned as both publisher and printer. In an age when the two functions were often separate, Cotes largely confined himself to printing, and left publishing to booksellers like Meighen, Crooke and Cooke, and others.

== Other works ==
Cotes worked on poetry, printing John Taylor the Water Poet's Wit and Mirth (1629) for James Boler, and James Day's A New Spring of Divine Poetry and Thomas Jordan's Poetical Varieties (both 1637), both for Humphrey Blunden. Most notably in this area, Cotes printed John Benson's important 1640 edition of Shakespeare's Poems. Cotes produced books on heraldry; religious and polemical works, by William Prynne, Hugh Latimer, ‘The Threefold Supper of Christ in the night that he was betrayed’ by Edward Kellett (1641), and other works; and a large share of ephemera and now-forgotten items – like The Book of Merry Riddles (1629), Wine, Beer, Ale and Tobacco (1630), and Robin Goodfellow, His Mad Pranks and Merry Jests (1640).

== Later years ==
During his later years, Thomas Cotes served as the clerk of his London parish, St. Giles without Cripplegate; as such, he was a member of their guild, the Parish Clerks' Company. That guild maintained its own printing press, for issuing bills of mortality. (The Stuart regime was serious about security and censorship: the parish clerks' printing press was kept in a triple-locked room.) Thomas Cotes served as the clerks' printer from 1636 until his death in 1641. Thereafter the clerks' printing was done by brother Richard Cotes, who in turn was followed by Ellen or Ellinor Cotes, Richard's widow.

Thomas Cotes was survived by two sons, James and Thomas. The exact date of his death is not recorded; he was buried on 15 July 1641. His last will and testament was signed on 22 June 1641 and probated on 19 July the same year. His will assigned full rights to their business to brother Richard, the surviving partner, in return for a payment of £100.
