= William Allen (actor) =

English actor

William Allen (died 1647) was a prominent English actor in the Caroline era. He belonged to both of the most important theatre companies of his generation, Queen Henrietta's Men and the King's Men.

Allen was a member of the Queen Henrietta's company through the main phase of its existence, from 1625 to 1636. Six cast lists for five plays survive for the company; Allen is one of only two men (the other being Michael Bowyer) who is included in all six lists. Allen played major roles:

- Captain Landby in Shirley's The Wedding
- Pandolph in Davenport's King John and Matilda
- Grimaldi the Renegado in Massinger's The Renegado
- Hannibal in Nabbes's Hannibal and Scipio
- Mullisheg in Heywood's The Fair Maid of the West (both parts).

The Queen Henrietta's company was disrupted and fractured by the long theatre closure from May 1636 to October 1637, due to a severe outbreak of bubonic plague. Allen was one of several members of the troupe who disappear from the surviving records in the later 1630s; he may have been among a quartet of Queen's actors who travelled to Dublin with James Shirley to work at the Werburgh Street Theatre there.

Allen was certainly in London c. 1640, when he was one of the five former Queen's players who became actors and sharers in the King's Men around that time. Allen and the others were named Grooms of the Chamber in January 1641. After the theatres were closed in September 1642at the start of the English Civil War, Allen, like several other members of the company (Charles Hart, Nicholas Burt, and William Robbins), became an officer in the Royalist army. Allen served as a "major and quartermaster-general at Oxford." He was one of the ten King's Men who signed the dedication of the first Beaumont and Fletcher folio in 1647, the year of his death.
