= Michael Bowyer =

Actor in English Renaissance theatre in the Jacobean and Caroline eras

Michael Bowyer (1599–1645) was an actor in English Renaissance theatre in the Jacobean and Caroline eras. He spent most of his maturity with Queen Henrietta's Men, but finished his career with the King's Men. With the former company, he was one of "those of principal note," according to James Wright's Historia Histrionica (1699), one of the troupe's "eminent actors."

Bowyer, the son of a John Bowyer, was christened on 20 September 1599 in Kidderminster, Worcestershire. He played a series of important roles through his career, including:

- Beaufort in James Shirley's The Wedding;
- King John in Robert Davenport's King John and Matilda;
- Vitelli in Philip Massinger's The Renegado;
- Mr. Spencer in Thomas Heywood's The Fair Maid of the West;
- Scipio in Thomas Nabbes's Hannibal and Scipio.

Robert Davenport dedicated his poem Too Late to Call Back Yesterday to Bowyer and Richard Robinson.

The Queen's Men were disrupted by a long theatre closure due to bubonic plague, which lasted from May 1636 to October 1637. Bowyer, along with three other veterans of that troupe, may have been with James Shirley at the Werburgh Street Theatre in Dublin from 1637 to 1640.

Bowyer was a member of the King's Men by January 1640. He was one of the six members of that company who were named Grooms of the Chamber on 22 January 1641, indicating that he was a sharer in the troupe by that time.

As with many actors, his fortunes passed into eclipse after the London theatres were closed in September 1642 at the start of the English Civil War. According to a 1655 lawsuit filed by fellow Queen Henrietta's and King's Man Theophilus Bird, Bowyer, along with Thomas Pollard and other members of the King's Men, sold off the company's play scripts and costumes sometime after the theatres closed. By the time of Bird's suit, Bowyer was a decade dead.

Little is known of Bowyer's personal life. He and his wife christened and then buried a son named William in 1621; and they christened and buried another son of the same name the following year, 1622.
