= Anthony Turner (actor) =

English actor

Anthony Turner (fl. 1622 – 1659) was a noted English actor in the Caroline era. For most of his career he worked with Queen Henrietta's Men, one of the leading theatre companies of the time.

Nothing is known of Turner's early life or the start of his career; by 1622 he was already a leading player with the Lady Elizabeth's Men. In 1625, Christopher Beeston formed a new company under the patronage of the new queen, Henrietta Maria; some members of the Lady Elizabeth's troupe, including Turner, joined the organization. Turner was a consistent presence in the known casts of the Queen Henrietta's company; he played —

- Justice Landby in Shirley's The Wedding
- Old Lord Bruce in Davenport's King John and Matilda
- Bashaw Alcade in Part 2 of Heywood's The Fair Maid of the West
- Crates and two other minor parts in Nabbes's Hannibal and Scipio.

Turner tended to play older men, like Justice Landby and Old Lord Bruce; yet he also took the role of a kitchen maid in Part 1 of Fair Maid – one of the few cases in which a mature actor, rather than a boy player or young adult actor, is known to have played a female character.

During the difficult years of the bubonic plague epidemic of 1636–37, Queen Henrietta's Men left Beeston and the Cockpit Theatre. The company fractured for a time, but in 1637 was reconstituted at the Salisbury Court Theatre, with several veterans, including Turner, as continuing members. Turner apparently won a leading position in the troupe; on 6 March 1640, when the Queen's Men were paid £80 for seven Court performances in the previous two years, Turner was the member who received the payment. On 8 January 1641, Turner and leading man Richard Perkins received royal liveries for fourteen members of the company.

Apart from his thespian skills, Turner is the subject of one of the more curious records in the annals of English Renaissance drama: In October 1624, his wife Dorothy got into legal trouble "for cruelly beating and abusing her husband Anthony Turner." Their marriage did not endure; Turner buried another wife, Joan, on 8 February 1640. The parish records of St. Giles in the Fields, home to many theatre people in Turner's era, also record the burials of four Turner children between 1636 and 1651.

Only a few signs of Turner's activity are available after the theatres were closed in 1642, at the start of the English Civil War. In Andrew Pennycuicke's 1653 edition of William Heminges's play The Fatal Contract, the preface is co-signed "A. T." – and this is thought to indicate Anthony Turner. In 1659, Turner got into trouble for acting in plays at the Red Bull Theatre, despite the official ban. (William Wintershall and a Henry Eaton paid a bond to assure Turner's court appearance.)
