= Queen Henrietta's Men =

Queen Henrietta's Men was an important playing company or troupe of actors of the Caroline era in London, England. At their peak of popularity, Queen Henrietta's Men were the second leading troupe of the day, after only the King's Men.

== Beginnings ==
The company was formed in 1625, at the start of the reign of King Charles I of England, by theatrical impresario Christopher Beeston under royal patronage of the new queen, Henrietta Maria. They were sometimes called the Queen's Majesty's Comedians or other variations on their name. The company was founded after an eight-month closure of the London theatres due to bubonic plague (March to October, 1625). The Lady Elizabeth's Men, then called the Queen of Bohemia's Men, had been resident at Beeston's Cockpit Theatre up to the plague closing, and provided the foundation of the new organization.

== Success ==
Theatre manager Beeston had had several different companies acting in his Cockpit Theatre since opening it in 1617; it was with Queen Henrietta's Men that he achieved the level of success he desired. James Shirley became something like the house dramatist of the group; plays by Philip Massinger, John Ford, and Thomas Heywood were also important in their repertory. The company staged revivals along with new plays; their 1633 production of Marlowe's The Jew of Malta was a major success. They played The Witch of Edmonton early in 1636.

In their 1625–36 heyday, the company gave 66 performances at Court, for which they were paid £900.

== Personnel ==
At its start, the actors of the new company came from several different troupes then active. Richard Perkins had been with Queen Anne's Men at the Red Bull Theatre and briefly (1623–25) with the King's Men. His success as Barabas in The Jew of Malta cemented his reputation as a great tragic actor. William Robbins also came from what had been Queen Anne's Men (it was generally called the Revels company, or simply the Red Bull company, after the 1619 death of Anne of Denmark). Robbins was the company's leading comic actor through the first phase of its existence.

William Shearlock and Anthony Turner were other prominent members; they were holdovers from the Lady Elizabeth's company. (The new company inherited that troupe's plays as well as its actors, works like George Chapman's Chabot, Massinger's The Renegado, and Shirley's Love Tricks.) Shearlock must have been a man of girth, since he performed the fat-man role of Lodam in Shirley's The Wedding. Apart from his other roles, Turner played a kitchen maid in Part 1 of Thomas Heywood's The Fair Maid of the West, one of the few cases in which a mature actor, rather than a boy player or a young man, is known to have played a female role.

In addition, the company included William Allen, Theophilus Bird (or Bourne), Hugh Clark, John Sumner, and Michael Bowyer. Bowyer handled leading-man roles; Hugh Clark was a boy player taking female roles, who later switched to adult male parts. Bird also played female roles for the company; he later married Beeston's daughter and was a successful actor both before and after the Interregnum. Allen and Sumner took significant supporting parts.

Six cast lists survive from five of the company's plays: from The Renegado, The Wedding, Robert Davenport's King John and Matilda, Thomas Nabbes's Hannibal and Scipio, and from both parts of Heywood's two-part Fair Maid of the West. Two actors, Allen and Bowyer, appear on all six lists, and five more, Clark, Perkins, Shearlock, Sumner, and Turner, appear on five — arguably a good indication of their durability and importance to the troupe.

Additional personnel included:

- Robert Axell played roles in Hannibal and Scipio, both parts of Fair Maid, and perhaps King John too.
- John Blaney was a boy player in the Children of the Chapel when he appeared in Jonson's Epicene in 1609. After a stint with Queen Anne's Men, he played Asambeg in The Renegado.
- Ezekiel Fenn played Sophonisba in Hannibal in 1635. In 1639 Henry Glapthorne published a poem, "For Ezekiel Fenn at his First Acting a Man's Part."
- Christopher Goad played with the company before moving to the King's Revels Men around 1635.
- John Page, like Bird, Clark, and Fenn, moved from female roles (as in The Wedding) to male (Hannibal and Scipio).
- Timothy Read was as early member (he was in The Wedding); after a period with the King's Revels Men, he returned for The English Moor c. 1637.
- Edward Rogers played women's roles in The Wedding and The Renegado, but then disappeared from the surviving records.
- George Stutfield pursued his career with several companies in the 1620s and '30s, including Queen Anne's Men and Prince Charles's Men.
- William Wilbraham played in The Wedding and Fair Maid. Like Goad, he later moved on to the King's Revels troupe. Surprisingly for a rather obscure actor, Wilbraham appears to have prospered: in 1640 he was able to lend £150 to Elizabeth Beeston, widow of Christopher — a loan secured by a mortgage on the Cockpit Theatre.
- Michael Mohun and Andrew Pennycuicke also served with the troupe as boy actors; William Cartwright and William Wintershall may have been members too.

== Change ==
In 1636 the company had a falling-out of some nature with their founder and manager, and moved to the rival Salisbury Court Theatre. Beeston had a reputation for breaking up theatre companies when it was in his interest to do so, as a way of maintaining control over recalcitrant and unruly actors; Philip Henslowe was accused of similar tactics in the previous generation. The mid-1630s was another difficult period for the theatrical profession, with a long theatre closure due to plague (May 1636 to October 1637). The Queen Henrietta's company split apart during this time; but it was reconstituted in October 1637, with veterans Perkins, Sherlock, Turner, and Sumner, at the Salisbury Court. According to his own testimony, Sir Henry Herbert, the Master of the Revels, was actively involved in rebuilding the Queen Henrietta's company; he apparently had a financial interest in the Salisbury Court Theatre.

(As for other troupe members: Axell, Bird, Fenn, Page, and Stutfield stayed at the Cockpit to join Beeston's Boys, the new group founded by Beeston. Four other members disappear from the scanty records of the later 1630s: Allen, Bowyer, Clark, and Robbins may have travelled with James Shirley to Dublin, and worked at the Werburgh Street Theatre there.)

The rebuilt company retained the queen's name and patronage. On 6 March 1640, Turner collected £80 in the company's name for seven Court performances in 1638 and 1639. The company lasted until the theatres closed in September 1642 at the start of the English Civil War.

== Repertory ==
The following list includes plays acted by Queen Henrietta's Men in the years cited, and gives an indication of the nature of their repertory:

- The Maid's Revenge, James Shirley, 1626
- The Wedding, Shirley, 1626–29
- The English Traveller, Heywood, 1627?
- The Martyred Soldier, Henry Shirley, 1627–35
- The Rape of Lucrece, Heywood, 1628
- The Witty Fair One, Shirley, 1628
- King John and Matilda, Davenport, 1628–29?
- The Grateful Servant, Shirley, 1629
- Hoffman, Henry Chettle, c. 1630
- If You Know Not Me, You Know Nobody, Heywood c. 1630 (both parts)
- Match Me in London, Thomas Dekker, c. 1630
- The Renegado, Massinger, 1630
- 'Tis Pity She's a Whore, John Ford, 1630?
- The White Devil, John Webster, c. 1630
- The Fair Maid of the West, Heywood, 1630–31
- The Humorous Courtier, Shirley, 1631
- Love Tricks, Shirley, 1631
- Love's Cruelty, Shirley, 1631
- The Traitor, Shirley, 1631
- The Ball, Shirley, 1632
- Hyde Park, Shirley, 1632
- The Maid of Honour, Massinger, 1632
- Perkin Warbeck, Ford, 1632
- The Prisoners, Thomas Killigrew, 1632–35
- The Bird in a Cage, Shirley, 1633
- Covent Garden, Thomas Nabbes, 1633
- The Gamester, Shirley, 1633
- A New Way to Pay Old Debts, Massinger, c. 1633
- A Tale of a Tub, Ben Jonson, 1633
- The Young Admiral, Shirley, 1633
- The Example, Shirley, 1634
- Love's Mistress, Heywood, 1634
- The Opportunity, Shirley, 1634
- The Shepherd's Holiday, Joseph Rutter, 1633–35
- The Antiquary, Shackerley Marmion, c. 1635
- Hannibal and Scipio, Nabbes, 1635
- The Coronation, Shirley, 1635, 1639
- Chabot, Admiral of France, Chapman and Shirley, 1635
- The Honest Whore, Dekker and Thomas Middleton, c. 1635
- The Lady of Pleasure, Shirley, 1635
- Claricilla, Killigrew, 1635–36
- The Duke's Mistress, Shirley, 1636
- The Hollander, Henry Glapthorne, 1636
- The Antipodes, Richard Brome, 1636–38
- The English Moor, Brome, 1637
- Mirocosmus, Nabbes, 1637
- The Careless Shepherdess, John Goffe, c. 1638
- The Fatal Contract, William Heminges, 1638–39
- The Noble Stranger, Lewis Sharpe, 1638–40
- A Mad World, My Masters, Middleton, c. 1640

Nineteen of the fifty-one works on the list are the work of James Shirley, the company's house dramatist through much of its existence.

== Aftermath ==
The company ended when the London theatres were closed in September 1642 at the start of the English Civil War. Some of its personnel (Anthony Turner, Michael Mohun, and Theophilus Bird are examples) resurfaced as members of the newly formed King's Company when the theatres re-opened in 1660. The King's Company also inherited a good portion of the repertory of Queen Henrietta's Men, including plays by Shirley, Brome, and Heywood.
