= John Sumner (actor) =

- Born: England
- Died: May 1649; England
- Occupation: Actor
- Years active: Caroline era (1625–1642)

John Sumner (died May 1649) was an English theatre actor during the Caroline era (1625–1642).

== Career ==
He was a long-time member of the Queen Henrietta's Men, one of the prime playing companies or acting troupes of the time and named for Henrietta Maria of France, the queen consort of England, Scotland and Ireland as the wife of King Charles I.

The existing evidence suggests that Sumner played with the company throughout its existence, from 1625 to 1642. Sumner was cast in all five of the company's productions for which casting information exists. He played these roles:

- Mustapha in Philip Massinger's The Renegado
- Marwood in James Shirley's The Wedding
- Himulco in Thomas Nabbes's Hannibal and Scipio
- Young Bruce in Robert Davenport's King John and Matilda
- the Duke of Florence in Thomas Heywood's The Fair Maid of the West, Part 2.

He probably also played in the company's production of John Ford's Love's Sacrifice as well.

The roles he played tended to be young male leads and vigorous dashing figures, which reveals something about the kind of actor he was.

== Personal life ==
James Wright's Historia Histrionica (1699) states that Sumner was a roommate of Richard Perkins, fellow actor with the Queen's company. As Wright put it, "Perkins and Sumner of the Cockpit [Theatre] kept house together in Clerkenwell, and were there buried...."

The date of Sumner's death is not known, although he was buried on 24 May 1649.
