= Hugh Clark (actor) =

English actor

Hugh Clark (died 1653) was a prominent English actor of the Caroline era. He worked in both of the main theatre companies of his time, Queen Henrietta's Men and the King's Men.

Clark was with Queen Henrietta's Men during the first and most significant phase of their existence, from 1625 to 1636. Like some other actors of English Renaissance theatre, Clark began as a boy player filling female roles. He played Gratiana in Shirley's The Wedding in 1626, and Bess Bridges in both parts of Heywood's The Fair Maid of the West in 1630–31. Not long after that time, though, Clark switched to adult male roles. He played Syphax and Nuntius in Nabbes's Hannibal and Scipio (1635), and Hubert in Davenport's King John and Matilda.

The Queen Henrietta's company was disrupted and fractured by the bubonic plague epidemic of 1636–37. Clark, like some other members of the troupe, disappears from the available records in 1637 and 1638; he may have been one of several actors from the company who travelled with James Shirley to Dublin to work at the Werburgh Street Theatre.

By 1639, however, Clark was back in London and a member of the King's Men; he appeared in their revival of The Custom of the Country in that year. He was a sharer in the company by January 1641, when he was one of the six sharers who were named Grooms of the Chamber. As a member of the company, he was one of the ten actors who signed the dedication of the first Beaumont and Fletcher folio in 1647. He was also involved in the January 1648 attempt to revive the company (which failed by the summer of that year, when the actors missed a payment due), despite the fact that the theatres had been closed by the Puritan regime of the English Commonwealth.
