= King John and Matilda =

Play written by Robert Davenport

King John and Matilda is a Caroline era stage play, a historical tragedy written by Robert Davenport. It was initially published in 1655; the cast list included in the first edition provides valuable information on some of the actors of English Renaissance theatre.

== Performance and publication ==
No certain information survives on the play's date of authorship or earliest production. Scholars generally date the play to c. 1628–29, though dates as early as 1624 and as late as 1634 have been proposed. The title page of the first edition states that the play was acted by Queen Henrietta's Men at the Cockpit Theatre; the actors in the cast list belonged to that company. The troupe staged a revival of Davenport's play c. 1638–39, perhaps a decade after its initial appearance.

The 1655 quarto was published by actor-turned-stationer Andrew Pennycuicke. The volume includes an epistle addressed "To the knowning Reader" that is signed with the initials "R. D." This has been taken by some commentators to indicate that Davenport was still alive when the play was printed. The epistle opens with a notable and sometimes-quoted line, "A good reader helps to make a book; a bad injures it."

The volume also bears Pennycuicke's dedication of the work to Montague Berty, the 2nd Earl of Lindsey.

== Sources ==
Caroline drama tends to show a lack of originality and a dependence on the precedents of earlier plays. This tendency is manifested to an extreme in King John and Matilda. The play bears a strong resemblance to The Death of Robert Earl of Huntington, the second of Anthony Munday's two Robin Hood plays (1598; printed 1601) – to the point that Davenport's work has been called a mere rewrite of Munday's play.

Davenport's character Hubert, the repentant henchman, resembles the character of the same name in Shakespeare's King John.

== The cast ==
For Queen Henrietta's Men, only five cast lists survive. (The others are for The Fair Maid of the West, Hannibal and Scipio, The Renegado, and The Wedding.) The 1655 quarto's cast list yields this information:

Role	Actor
King John	Michael Bowyer
Fitzwater	Richard Perkins
Old Lord Bruce	Anthony Turner
Young Bruce	John Sumner
Chester	"M. Jackson"
Oxford	Christopher Goad
Leister	John Young
Hubert	Hugh Clark
Pandulph	William Allen
Brand	William Shearlock

The cast list contains three peculiarities. It includes three female characters of the play, Matilda, Queen Isabel, and the Lady Abbess, but does not identify the actors who filled the roles. This might be regarded as doubly curious, since Pennycuicke had been a boy actor taking female roles in the final phase of English Renaissance drama, before the London theatres were closed in 1642 at the start of the English Civil War. By his own claim, Pennycuicke was the last performer to fill the role of Matilda, which must have been in the 1638–39 revival.

The second peculiarity is that the cast list offers praise for two, but only two, of the actors. It states that Perkins's "action gave Grace to the Play," and that Shearlock "performed excellently well."

Thirdly, the list includes a mystery man. All the actors are titled "Master" – from "M. Bowyer" to "M. Shirelock." Yet the "Master Jackson" who played Chester is otherwise unknown in the records of the Queen's Men. The company did have a member named Robert Axell, whose name was sometimes rendered "Axall" or "Axen" in the flexible orthography of the seventeenth century. It has been suggested that "Jackson" might be a corruption of "Axen," indicating Robert Axell.

Like other cast lists of the period, this one is not perfect; it neglects the characters Richmond, Lady Bruce, and George Bruce.

== History ==
King John had an important role in the political, religious, historiographic mindset of the English Renaissance and Reformation – he was both hero and villain. Davenport relied on prior plays rather than historical research in crafting his drama; and in so doing, he created a work that reflects something of the popular significance, and the ambiguity, of John as a historical figure.

== Synopsis ==
As the play opens, John is at odds with the rebellious barons – the ones who in history made him sign the Magna Carta. In this play, they are Fitzwater, Leister, Richmond, the Old Lord Bruce, and his elder son Young Bruce. The King is supported by the Lords Oxford and Chester. While he deals with political matters, John also engages in a lustful pursuit of Matilda, Fitzwater's daughter. (In the first of Munday's Robin Hood plays, The Downfall of Robert Earl of Huntington, the heroine is Maid Marian for the first 780 lines, then suddenly becomes Matilda, no explanation given. Davenport's heroine derives from Munday's.) Matilda falls into the King's clutches. John's queen, Isabel, scratches and abuses the girl as a harlot; but Matilda retains her traditional feminine virtues of chastity and patience. Matilda is rescued by Young Bruce and Richmond.

In pursuit of the rebels, the King and his henchman Hubert take custody of Lord Bruce's wife, Lady Bruce, and their younger son George. The woman and boy are turned over to the villainous Brand, who, under Chester's orders, locks them away and denies them food.

In his quarrel with Pope Innocent III, John is shown submitting to Pandulph, the papal legate. The rebellious barons urge John to resist, in the Protestant spirit of the play's historical era; but John yields. Pandulph accepts John's submission and returns the crown to him. John's continued arrogance and immorality prevent a true reconciliation with the barons, however. Oxford, acting for the King, captures Matilda again; but Young Bruce defeats him in combat and rescues her. Hubert and the King use trickery to obtain Matilda once more. Matilda's patient virtue placates the Queen's resentment, and even Hubert comes to sympathize, "forcibly charmed by her tears and entreaties." Together they help Matilda take refuge in Dunmow Abbey.

Lady Bruce and her young son are shown suffering the pangs of hunger in prison; they both die of starvation onstage.

John is so obsessed with Matilda that he offers to divorce Isabel, marry Matilda, and make her queen. Accompanied by the Abbess, Matilda looks down from the abbey walls as both the King and her father Fitzwater try to persuade her – John, to yield, and Fitzwater, to resist the King's temptations. Matilda has no trouble remaining true to her innate virtue. The rejected King decides that Matilda must die; he has Brand deliver a poisoned glove to her. She dies onstage, a martyr to virtue.

The murderer of Lady Bruce, George Bruce, and Matilda does not escape; Young Bruce confronts Brand, fights with him, and kills him.

In the aftermath of Matilda's murder, John finally feels sincere remorse. He repents his sins, and reconciles with the Queen and the barons. The final scene portrays Matilda's funeral.
