= Timothy Read =

17th-century English actor

Timothy Read (fl. 1626–1647) was a comic actor of the Caroline era, and one of the most famous and popular performers of his generation.

== Biography ==
As with many other performers of his historical era, nothing is known of Read's early life. The first evidence of his career comes in 1626, when he played Cardona, a woman's role, in James Shirley's The Wedding with Queen Henrietta's Men. Read appears to have spent the early 1630s with the King's Revels Men, but returned to the Queen Henrietta's company after the bubonic plague epidemic of 1636–37, when personnel of the two troupes combined. With the Queen's company, Read played Buzzard in Richard Brome's The English Moor, perhaps in 1637.

He won his fame as a dancer. Performances in English Renaissance theatre, even tragedies, ended with a clown dancing a jig, and Read was one of a long line of comics, reaching from Richard Tarlton through John Shank, who earned a large and welcoming audience through this practice.

One of the best indices of Read's fame occurs in The Stage Player's Complaint, a pamphlet printed in 1641. The pamphlet presents the two leading comic actors of the day, Andrew Cane and Timothy Read, in a dialogue about the difficulties of the clowning life. (The summer of 1641 saw another theatre closure due to plague.) In the pamphlet, Cane, renowned for his clever repartee, is called Quick; Read, famous for his fast feet, is called Light. The text of the Complaint seems to indicate that Read was then a member of the King's Men, though scholars have disputed the point.

The Puritan authorities of London closed the theatres in 1642, at the start of the English Civil War; but the actors continued to perform, when and where they could. Read was among the players arrested on 6 October 1647, during a performance of Beaumont and Fletcher's A King and No King at the Salisbury Court Theatre.

Read's end is mysterious; but his continuing fame is demonstrated by allusions to him, in works from his own and the next generation. In the Praeludium of The Careless Shepherdess (published 1656), one speaker says,

I never saw Reade peeping through the curtain,
But ravishing joy entered my heart.

The burials of two Read children, a son and daughter, are recorded in the parish records of St. Giles, Cripplegate, in 1645 and 1646.
