= Richard Perkins (actor) =

- Born: c. 1579/c. 1585
- Died: 1650
- Occupation: actor
- Known for: his performance in the role of Barabas in Christopher Marlowe's The Jew of Malta

Richard Perkins (c. 1579/c. 1585–1650) was a prominent early seventeenth-century actor, most famous for his performance in the role of Barabas in Christopher Marlowe's The Jew of Malta. At the peak of his career in the 1630s, many contemporaries judged Perkins to be the premier tragedian of his generation.

== Early life ==
Nothing is known about the early life of Perkins, and the year of his birth has been estimated at 1579 or 1585. His professional career had begun by 1602, when he was a member of Worcester's Men; he remained with that company throughout its next incarnation as Queen Anne's Men, 1603–1619. With the death of Anne of Denmark in 1619, the troupe lost its name and patron, but continued in its theatre, and was known as the Red Bull company or the Revels company. After a relatively brief stint with the King's Men, 1623–1625, Perkins became a founding member of the new Queen Henrietta's Men in 1625. Perkins remained with that company until the theatres were closed at the start of the English Civil War in 1642, and became their leading man and star.

== Career ==
Perkins achieved his greatest fame as Barabas in the company's 1633 revival of The Jew of Malta. He was also involved in most of the troupe's productions during its 1625–42 lifetime, including Heywood's The Fair Maid of the West (he played Mr. Goodlack), Shirley's The Wedding (playing Sir John Belfare) and The Lady of Pleasure (Sir Thomas Bornwell), Davenport's King John and Matilda (Fitzwater), Nabbes's Hannibal and Scipio (Hanno), and Ford's Love's Sacrifice (Duke Caraffa).

It was through such plays and roles that Perkins achieved his reputation as "a versatile, self-possessed and graceful actor whose skills would have been well-suited to a private theatre such as the Phoenix." His range of roles included "romantic villain, dignified father, honest plain-spoken old man."

Perkins had a noteworthy connection with the plays of John Webster. He was in the initial production of The White Devil in February 1612, probably in the role of Flamenio. Though the play's premier was a failure, Webster praised Perkins's performance in a note appended to the 1612 first edition of the play:

in particular I must remember the well-approved industry of my friend Master Perkins, and confess the worth of his action did crown both the beginning and the end.

Perkins was also in the successful revival production of the play c. 1630, in which he most likely took the role of Brachiano. Webster may have designed the role of Romelio in his The Devil's Law Case for Perkins, and may have written the play for the premier of Queen Anne's Men at their new Phoenix playhouse in 1617. (After the Cockpit Theatre was damaged by rioting apprentices at Shrovetide in spring 1617, manager Christopher Beeston had the theatre rebuilt and re-christened the Phoenix. It was for this re-opening that Webster's play may have been intended.)

== Personal life ==
As with most actors of his era, little in known of Perkins's personal life. His first wife died in 1621; he remarried the same year.

Naturally and inevitably, Perkins's career was severely curtailed by the 1642 closing of the theatres. He was buried on 20 April 1650, in the parish of St. James, Clerkenwell. According to James Wright's Historia Histrionica (1699), Perkins and fellow Queen's Man John Sumner were housemates: "Perkins and Sumner of the Cockpit, kept house together in Clerkenwell, and were there buried." (Sumner predeceased Perkins, and was buried on 24 May 1649.)
