= The Renegado =

Stage play by Philip Massinger

The Renegado, or The Gentleman of Venice is a late Jacobean stage play, a tragicomedy written by Philip Massinger and first published in 1630. The play has attracted critical attention for its treatment of cultural conflict between Christian Europe and Muslim North Africa.

Massinger based the plot of his play on a novel by Miguel de Cervantes titled Los Baños de Argel, which had been printed in 1615.

== Performance and publication ==
The Renegado was licensed for performance by Sir Henry Herbert, the Master of the Revels, on 17 April 1624. It was acted at the Cockpit Theatre by the Lady Elizabeth's Men; when that troupe was merged or re-organized into Queen Henrietta's Men in the following year, 1625, the play remained in their repertory. The 1630 quarto was printed by Augustine Matthews for the bookseller John Waterson; it bears commendatory verses, including one by James Shirley. Massinger dedicated his drama to George Harding, 8th Baron Berkeley, a prominent literary patron of the day who was the dedicatee of Burton's The Anatomy of Melancholy (1621) and Webster's The Duchess of Malfi (1623), among other works.

The play was revived in 1662, early in the Restoration era.

== The cast ==
The 1630 quarto features a cast list for the play, making The Renegado one of the few plays in English Renaissance drama for which cast information exists. (Only five cast lists survive for the entire history of Queen Henrietta's Men. The others are for The Fair Maid of the West, Hannibal and Scipio, King John and Matilda, and The Wedding.) The actors and their roles were:

Role	Actor
Asambeg, Viceroy of Tunis	John Blaney
Mustapha, basha of Aleppo	John Sumner
Vitelli, a Venetian genleman, disguised as a merchant	Michael Bowyer
Francisco, a Jesuit	William Reignalds
Antonio Grimaldi, the Renegado	William Allen
Carazie, an eunuch	William Robbins
Gazet, servant to Vitelli	Edward Shakerley
Donusa, niece to Amurath	Edward Rogers
Paulina, sister to Vitelli	Theophilus Bird

== Synopsis ==
Set in Tunis, the titular "renegado" is Antonio Grimaldi, who has converted to Islam and become a pirate. The true protagonist of the play, however, is Vitelli, a Venetian gentleman; he has come to Tunis disguised as a merchant, in order to search for his sister Paulina, who has been captured by Grimaldi's pirates and sold into the harem of the city's Viceroy, Asambeg. Even in the harem, however, Paulina's virtue is protected by an amulet she wears around her neck; Asambeg is infatuated with her and treats her with respect. A Turkish princess named Donusa falls in love with Vitelli; when this is discovered, they are both imprisoned in the Black Tower. Donusa tries to convince Vitelli to convert to Islam and marry her, and so gain freedom for them both; Vitelli refuses, and in their ensuing conversation converts Donusa to Christianity.

The renegade Grimaldi falls afoul of Asambeg's bad temper, and his career as a pirate is finished. He experiences remorse for his past, and engineers the escape of Vitelli, Donusa, Paulina, and himself from Tunis back to Italy.

== Critical commentary ==
Nineteenth-century critics tended to interpret the play's positive portrayal of a Jesuit confessor as a sign of Massinger's own supposed Roman Catholicism. The play's inclusion of a eunuch character has also drawn comment.

Jowitt, in the early 21st century, reads The Renegado as a political allegory on the Prince of Wales and the Duke of Buckingham's failed trip to woo the Infanta Maria in the Spanish. Donusa and Vitelli are viewed as personifying Maria and the Prince. The ideological difficulties involved in their relationship can then be seen as raising doubts about the wisdom of such a match. Francisco's Jesuitical character is then an allegory of the Duke of Buckingham.

== Sources ==
- Fuchs, Barbara. Mimesis and Empire: The New World, Islam, and European Identities. Cambridge, Cambridge University Press, 2004.
- Garrett, Martin. Massinger: The Critical Heritage. London, Routledge, 1991.
- Schelling, Felix Emmanuel. Elizabethan Drama 1558–1642. 2 Volumes, Boston, Houghton Mifflin, 1908.
- Vitkus, Daniel J. Three Turk Plays from Early Modern England: Selimus, A Christian Turned Turk, and The Renegado. New York, Columbia University Press, 2000.
