= Theophilus Bird =

English actor

Theophilus Bird, or Bourne, (1608 – 1663) was a seventeenth-century English actor. Bird began his stage career in the Stuart era of English Renaissance theatre, and ended it in the Restoration period; he was one of the relatively few actors who managed to resume their careers after the eighteen-year enforced hiatus (1642–60) when the theatres were closed during the English Civil War and the Interregnum.

== Beginnings ==
Theophilus was the son of William Bird, an actor long associated with the theatrical enterprise of Philip Henslowe and active in the years 1597–1622. Theophilus was baptized on 7 December 1608. Both father William and son Theophilus alternatively spelled their family name as Bird or Bourne. The extensive Henslowe papers in the collection of Dulwich College contain many mentions of the elder Bird and members of his family. The younger Bird started out as a boy player acting female roles, as was customary at the time; he played Paulina in Massinger's The Renegado for Queen Henrietta's Men in 1625. He played Tota, the Queen of Fez, in Thomas Heywood's The Fair Maid of the West, Part 2 around 1630, when he was 21 years old.

== Maturity ==
Like most boy actors, Bird moved on the adult roles, like Masinissa in the company's 1635 production of Thomas Nabbes's Hannibal and Scipio.

Bird married Anne Beeston, the eldest daughter of Christopher Beeston, the leading theatrical impresario of his generation; through this familial connection, Bird helped Beeston run his theatrical enterprise. In the large-scale disruption of the theatrical profession in 1636–37, when the London theatres were closed due to bubonic plague and Queen Henrietta's Men left Beeston's Cockpit Theatre for the rival Salisbury Court Theatre, Bird remained with his father-in-law and helped him to establish and run the new company known as Beeston's Boys. Once Beeston died in 1638, his enterprise was taken over by his son William Beeston — but the younger Beeston was unable to maintain his father's level of success.

Bird moved to the King's Men for the 1640–42 years, along with five other of the troupe's actors. yet there was no lasting personal break between the younger Beeston and his brother-in-law, since Bird was acting as William Beeston's agent in 1652, when Beeston was still trying, despite Puritan opposition, to pursue theatrical activities in London. On 25 March that year, Bird paid £480 of Beeston's money to obtain a lease on the remains of the Salisbury Court. (The lease mentions that Bird was living in the parish of St Giles in the Fields at the time. The records of that parish list the burials of two of Bird's children in 1638 and 1642.)

Bird was made a Groom of the Chamber on 22 January 1641, along with five other members of the company. Bird's status as a King's Man meant that he was one of the ten members of that troupe who signed the dedication of the first Beaumont and Fletcher folio of 1647 (though he had not been one of the actors who had played in the company's productions of Fletcher's plays during the previous three decades).

Bird was also active, at least in a marginal way, in the world of authorship, letters, and publishing. He wrote or co-wrote prefaces or dedications to dramatic works published in his era — the first editions of The Lady's Trial (1639), The Sun's Darling (1656), and The Witch of Edmonton (1658), works of John Ford and collaborators.

== Later years ==
Bird resumed his acting career once the theatres re-opened in 1660. He was one of the fifteen men — Thomas Killigrew, Sir Robert Howard, and thirteen actors — who signed the 28 January 1661 agreement that defined the sharers in the King's Company. In September 1662, he reportedly broke his leg while fencing onstage, during a performance of Sir John Suckling's play Aglaura. He resumed stage work after his recovery, and played Prospero in Richard Rhodes's comedy Flora's Vagaries on 3 November 1663.

Bird's son, Theophilus Bird the Younger, pursued his own acting career during the Restoration era.
