= William Robbins (actor) =

Comic actor

William Robbins (died October 1645), also Robins, Robinson, or Robson, was a prominent comic actor in the Jacobean and Caroline eras. During the English Civil War he was a captain in the Royalist army and was killed during the siege of Basing House.

== Biography ==
Robbins career began by 1617, when he was with Queen Anne's Men; he remained with that company for the remainder of its existence. In 1625 Robbins joined the newly formed Queen Henrietta's Men, and worked with that company until 1636. His role as Rawbone in their production of James Shirley's The Wedding shows that he was a thin-man clown, what his own era called a "lean fool," like John Sinklo or John Shank. Robbins also played Carazie the eunuch in Philip Massinger's The Renegado, Clem in Thomas Heywood's The Fair Maid of the West, and the title character, the "changeling" Antonio, in Middleton and Rowley's The Changeling.

The Queen Henrietta's company was disrupted by a long theatre closure due to bubonic plague in 1636–37. Robbins may have been one of the members of the troupe who travelled to Ireland with James Shirley to work at the Werburgh Street Theatre in Dublin in the later 1630s.

Robbins finished his acting career with a couple of years with the King's Men. He was made a Groom of the Chamber in January 1641, along with five other actors in the troupe. After the theatres closed in 1642, Robbins, like some other actors (fellow King's Men Charles Hart and Nicholas Burt are good examples), fought on the Royalist side during the English Civil War. Robbins attained the rank of captain before dying during the siege of Basing House in October 1645. James Wright, in his Historia Histrionica (1699), maintains that Robbins was shot in the head after surrendering, by a soldier in the Commonwealth forces (the soldier reportedly was Thomas Harrison, who later became a general in the Commonwealth army.)

== Family ==
Robbins was married to Cicely Sands Brown Robbins, sister of King's Man James Sands and widow of actor Robert Browne.
