= Carolean era =

Period of English history

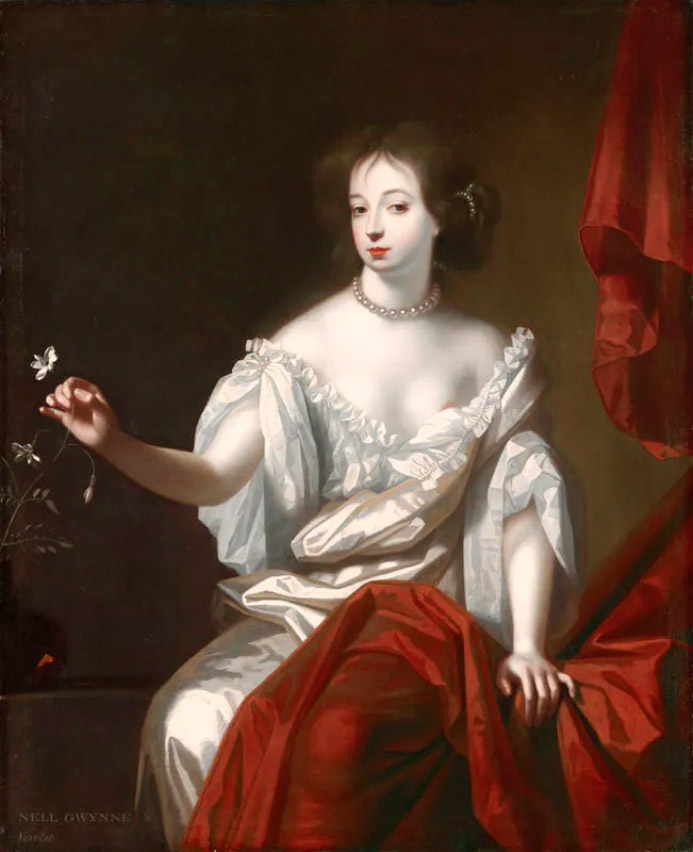
Nell Gwyn, a courtesan, who rose to be the King's mistress and an icon of the Carolean era

In the English-speaking world, Carolean era refers to the reign of Charles II (1660–1685) and usually refers to the music and arts of the time period. It is better known as The Restoration. This era followed the Interregnum, the time period when there was no monarch. The period was noted for the flourishing of the arts following the demise of The Protectorate. It ended with the Glorious Revolution of 1688 when James II of England & VII of Scotland went into exile.

The Carolean era should not be confused with the Caroline era, which refers to the reign of Charles II's father, Charles I (1625–1649). The phrase came into use again following the accession of King Charles III.

== The Carolean Style ==
During The Restoration of the monarchy, the Carolean Style of art was born. In the time that Charles II was king, the English decorative art and literature of the time flourished. This era introduced French and Dutch artistic styles to England. Furniture was crafted with exotic materials, this allowed England to adopt and branch out taste in decorative art through their furniture.

== The New Carolean Era ==
With the accession of King Charles III in September 2022 is what some call a new Carolean Era. These transitions are important historical moments, signifying a new era for the country. The names of the eras are taken from the names of the current monarch. The term Carolean stems from the Latin name for Charles, Carolus.

The reign of King Charles III introduces a modern Carolean Era. The modern day Carolean Era differs from the Carolean Era during the reign of King Charles II as his Carolean Era was a period of flourishing arts. The modern Carolean Era refers to a significant change in history and society.

== See also ==
- Restoration (England)
