= The Fair Maid of the West =

English play by Thomas Heywood (published 1631)

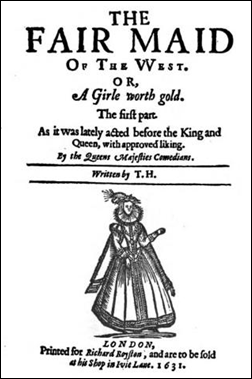
Title page of The Fair Maid of the West.

The Fair Maid of the West, or a Girl Worth Gold, Parts 1 and 2 is a work of English Renaissance drama, a two-part play written by Thomas Heywood that was first published in 1631.

== Date ==
The dates of authorship of the two parts of The Fair Maid of the West are not known with certainty. Part 1 involves historical events of 1596 and 1597, and refers to Queen Elizabeth I in terms suggesting she was still alive at the time of its authorship; scholars therefore date Part 1 to the 1597–1603 period. Significant differences in tone between the two parts suggest that they were written separately, perhaps widely separately, in time: "What slight evidence there is...indicates that Heywood wrote Part II some twenty-five or thirty years after Part I."

== Publication ==
The drama was entered into the Stationers' Register on 16 June 1631; later that year, both parts were published together, in a quarto by the bookseller Richard Royston. The volume may have been typeset in the shop of Miles Flesher, a printer who worked repeatedly for Royston in the early 1630s. The quarto bears Heywood's dedications of the two parts to two friends: Part 1 to John Othow and Part 2 to Thomas Hammon, both lawyers of Gray's Inn.

The 1631 quarto was the sole edition of the work prior to the 19th century.

== Performance ==
The earliest production of Part 1 is unrecorded; but the play was revived c. 1630 by Queen Henrietta's Men. The plays are known to have been acted at Court in the winter of 1630–31. In one reasonable hypothesis, Heywood wrote Part 2 at about the time Part 1 was being revived, or c. 1630.

It appears that in preparation for the Court performance, a manuscript fair copy of both parts of the play was prepared, and that this fair copy later served as the copy text for the compositors who set the 1631 printed text into type.

== Genre ==
Dramaturgically, The Fair Maid of the West is normally classed as a comedy, rather than any of the other standard classifications; yet it is a comedy of a specific type. Part 1, at least, draws upon what were then current events or contemporary history, and belongs to a group of similar Elizabethan plays; George Peele's The Battle of Alcazar (c. 1588–89) and the anonymous Captain Thomas Stukeley (1596) are two prominent examples of the type, though there are many others in what was a popular subgenre of the era. One modern editor has described the play as "adventure drama," characterized by "simple, straightforward emotions, black and white morality, absolute poetic justice, and, above all, violent rapidity of action."

Heywood drew upon contemporary events for the atmosphere and ambience of his play. For plot materials he relied mainly on the general folklore and ballad literature of his period, rather than on any more formal literary sources.

To a significant degree, The Fair Maid of the West also partakes of melodrama; it is easily and naturally classed with several other "fair maid" plays of its era—The Fair Maid of the Exchange (c. 1602), often attributed to Heywood; and the anonymous The Fair Maid of Bristow (before 1604), The Fair Maid of London, and The Fair Maid of Italy.

== Cast ==
Only five cast lists survive for the whole history of Queen Henrietta's Men. (The others are for Hannibal and Scipio, King John and Matilda, The Renegado, and The Wedding.) The 1631 quarto is unusual in that it provides cast lists for the productions of both parts by Queen Henrietta's Men. The actors and the parts they played were:

Actor	Role, Pt. 1	Role, Pt. 2
Hugh Clark	Bess Bridges	Bess Bridges
Michael Bowyer	Mr. Spencer	Mr. Spencer
Richard Perkins	Mr. Goodlack	Mr. Goodlack
William Allen	Mullisheg	Mullisheg
William Robbins	Clem	Clem
William Shearlock	Roughman	Roughman
Robert Axell	English Merchant	Duke of Mantua
Anthony Turner	Kitchenmaid	Bashaw Alcade
Christopher Goad	Forset; Spanish Captain	Forset; Duke of Ferrara
Theophilus Bird	...	Tota
John Sumner	...	Duke of Florence
William Wilbraham	Bashaw Alcade	...

Hugh Clark, the actor who played the title character, specialized in female roles as a youth—he played the female lead in the company's production of James Shirley's The Wedding c. 1626—before graduating to adult male roles, a transition common for boy actors of the period. His age at the time he played Bess Bridges is unknown, though apparently he had already been married for several years by that point in his career.

== Synopsis ==
=== Part 1 ===
The first part of The Fair Maid of the West opens in Plymouth, between two key events of the Anglo-Spanish War—after the English raid on Cádiz in 1596 and before the so-called "Islands Voyage," the English raid on the Azores in 1597. At the play's start, Bess Bridges is a young woman who works as a tapster in a Plymouth tavern; her beauty and charm and her reputation for chastity, "her modesty and fair demeanor," have made her a focus of attention for many male patrons. In particular, one Master Spencer has fallen in love with her, and she reciprocates his feelings—though Spencer's friend Master Goodlack cautions Spencer over Bess's low birth and her occupation.

The early scenes portray the rough and tumble atmosphere of Bess's social milieu, as the town fills up with soldiers and sailors in preparation for the raid on the Azores. A man named Carroll insults and abuses Bess in the tavern; Spencer quarrels with him, fights him, and kills him. To avoid prosecution, Spencer and Goodlack leave with the departing fleet. Spencer sends Bess to a tavern he owns at Fowey in Cornwall (spelled "Foy" in the play); there she encounters Clem, the play's clown, who provides the comic relief of both parts.

The tavern society in Fowey is as rough as that in Plymouth; in particular, a bully called Roughman disrupts the business at Bess's tavern. In the belief that bullies are generally cowards, Bess disguises herself as a man to confront and humiliate Roughman; in response, he reforms and becomes her brave and loyal follower. Goodlack returns from the Azores, in the false belief that Spencer has been killed in action. Spencer has named Bess his heir in his last will and testament—providing she has maintained her honor; otherwise the estate goes to Goodlack. With a strong financial motive to prove her unchaste, Goodlack tests Bess, insults and humiliates her; but she behaves with dignified restraint, winning his admiration. Under the mistaken impression of Spencer's death, Bess turns privateer: she uses her wealth to equip a ship, and leads Goodlack, Roughman, Clem and her crew in attacking Spanish and Turkish shipping.

Spencer, meanwhile, has escaped the Spanish in the Azores and has made his way to Morocco. Bess and her crew stop in Mamorah, then the port city of Fez, for provisions; Mullisheg, the king of Fez, hears of her beauty and invites her party to his court. ("Mullisheg" is a corruption of Mulai Sheik, the title of three Moroccan rulers in Heywood's historical era.) Mullisheg is taken with Bess, but she retains her virtue and inspires Mullisheg to more noble and honorable behavior. Spencer meets his old friends; he and Bess marry under Mullisheg's sponsorship.

=== Part 2 ===
The second part opens with a new character, Tota, Mullisheg's wife. She resents the English guests and feels slighted in the current court society. Mullisheg, too, is unhappy in his noble forbearance, and experiences a renewal of his attraction for Bess. Both try to subvert members of the English party to help them in their schemes. The English realize their danger, and arrange proposed sexual liaisons for both Mullisheg and Tota; but they work a double version of the bed trick that is so common in English Renaissance drama. Mullisheg thinks he is going to have sex with Bess, and Tota with Spencer, but in the dark they actually sleep with each other.

The English try to sneak away from the now-dangerous court, and almost succeed, though Spencer is caught. Bess and the others return to the court rather than abandon Spencer; in what amounts to a contest of noble behavior, the English overawe the Moroccans, and Mullisheg releases them to go their way.

At sea, the English are attacked by French pirates; in the sea fight, the English party is separated. They land in Italy, Spencer in Ferrara, Goodlack in Mantua, and Bess and the others in Florence. The English win the regard and approval of the rulers of the three states; like so many other men, The Duke of Florence becomes infatuated with Bess. Eventually the English party re-assembles in Florence. The Duke plays upon Spencer's sense of honor to make it appear that he has abandoned Bess and is indifferent to her. Now a married woman, Bess reacts with apparent rage; she wins the Duke's permission to punish Spencer, and the other members of their party regard her as a "shrew" and a "Medusa." Her rage, however, is only pretended, and the couple are re-united happily with their friends at the play's end.

(Critics have noted the differences in tone between the two parts. In the first, Bess is vigorous and active, disguising herself as a man and pursuing a privateer's career; in the second, she's largely passive. In the first part, she is emotionally honest, candid, and forthright; in the second, she feigns emotions she does not feel. Part 1 shows the freshness of Elizabethan drama, while Part 2 has more of the mannered feeling of a Caroline era play.)

== Themes ==
=== Gender ===
Scholars have analyzed Heywood's construction of gender dynamics in the play. Scholar Jennifer Higginbotham notes that throughout the course of the play, the term "lady" comes to supplant "maid" in defining Bess, which Higginbotham identifies as part of the play's broader concern with her chastity. As an unmarried, financially well-off woman in her own right, Bess thematically alludes to Elizabethan anxieties surrounding Elizabeth I as a female head of state. The multiple relationships she holds with the male characters of the play and the multiple instances in which Bess cross-dresses allows her to repeatedly confront existing gender and power dynamics and enable several situations throughout the play when she is empowered to define her own social standing rather than allowing for the male characters around her to define her societal role or power.

The attribution by Heywood of Bess as being from "the West" establishes the character of Bess (and indirectly, Elizabeth I) as a metaphorical symbol connected to the English nation itself, which scholars have noted was especially pertinent given the historical anxiety over the status of Elizabeth I as an unmarried woman and her lack of biological heirs. Heywood's attribution also serves as a marker of the relationship England held with the Atlantic Ocean, in which the English sought to venture out into in order to engage in mercantile pursuits while at the same time weakening their Spanish and Portuguese rivals by raiding their American settlements and merchant shipping.

=== Privateering ===
As part of her efforts to counter Spain's dominance in the Americas and Europe, Elizabeth I authorized numerous privateers (state-sanctioned pirates known as Sea Dogs) to attack Spanish shipping and settlements. The Anglo-Dutch capture and sack of Cádiz, Spain, which privateer Sir Francis Drake participated in, is directly referenced the first lines of the play, and scholars have analyzed how the play references Drake, privateering, its advantages and the relationship between Elizabeth I and state-sanctioned piracy. In the play, when Bess (in not a dissimilar manner to Drake) takes to the sea as part of a privateering expedition against the Spanish, she addresses the fact that her fellow privateers are acting in the name of their queen. According to scholar Barbara Fuchs, "Bess's expedition reflects some of the ambiguities between piracy and privateering". Ensuring the loyalty of privateers was a paramount concern for European governments of the period, as suspicions abounded that once a privateer had acquired enough wealth they could abandon the cause they were serving, possibly to enter into the service of another nation. In order to secure their loyalty, Elizabeth I frequently bestowed valuable gifts that symbolized and uplifted her image and reign to her privateers, most notably Sir Francis Drake.

The Drake Jewel, appearing in two of Francis Drake's portraits, both painted by Flemish artist Marcus Gheeraerts the Younger in 1591 and 1594, is an example of Elizabeth I's gifts and the valuable ties of personal and political relationship they created. Currently on loan in the Victoria and Albert Museum in London, the Drake Jewel is a locket composed of enameled gold decorated with inset diamonds, rubies, and a hanging cluster of pearls. The exterior is an intaglio cut dual cameo of sardonyx; the bust of an African male in profile superimposed over that of a European female. The interior of the locket cover is a phoenix, one of Elizabeth I's emblems, and the interior of the locket itself holds a miniature portrait of Elizabeth I, painted by English goldsmith Nicholas Hilliard. Bestowed as a sign of Elizabeth I's favor and Drake's favorable standing with her, the jewel and the portrait it contained, to be worn on his person, was a continuing representation of his loyalty, devotion, and allegiance to the Crown.

=== Religion ===
The depictions of the Muslim Moors as villains in the play who are ultimately defeated has been interpreted by scholars as part of an Elizabethan dramatic tradition which emerged in response to raids on Christian merchant shipping by Barbary corsairs from the 16th century onwards. Heywood, the son of a priest, used the play to "commemorate the heroic deeds of [Christian] captives as resisting the lure of a ‘false’ Mohamettan religion with its harem and lasciviousness; even overpowering their captors and managing to escape the tyranny of the Moors".

== Critical analyses ==
The play's picture of the role of women in society, and its treatment of cross-cultural issues (the West vs. Near East and Christianity versus Islam), have attracted the attention of interested modern critics.

== Modern productions ==
The Royal Shakespeare Company mounted Trevor Nunn's well-received production in the 1986–7 season; it was the inaugural production of Stratford-on-Avon's Swan Theatre in December 1986, then played Newcastle upon Tyne before transferring to the Mermaid Theatre in London. It starred Sean Bean as Spencer, Imelda Staunton as Bess, and Pete Postlethwaite as Roughman.

The North American premier of The Fair Maid of the West was directed at Whitman College by Jack Freimann in its 1986–87 season.

A condensation and adaptation of The Fair Maid of the West by Kevin Theis was staged by the CT20 Ensemble in Chicago in November 1994. The script is available through Dramatic Publishing at www.DramaticPublishing.com.

The American Shakespeare Center's 2010 Fall Season includesd a production of the first part of The Fair Maid of the West. Performances ran between 6 October and 27 November 2010.

The Philadelphia Artist's Collective put the first part of The Fair Maid of the West on from 1 April 2015 through 18 April 2015.

The RSC in Stratford-upon-Avon presented a new edit of the two parts in December 2023 at the Swan Theatre.
