= Hannibal and Scipio =

Hannibal and Scipio is a Caroline era stage play, a classical tragedy written by Thomas Nabbes. The play was first performed in 1635 by Queen Henrietta's Men, and was first published in 1637. The first edition of the play contained a cast list of the original production, making the 1637 quarto an important information source on English Renaissance theatre.

== Literary connections ==
As its title indicates, the play relates the historical rivalry between Hannibal and Scipio Africanus. Out of the vast array of historical source material on the subject, Nabbes relied primarily upon the account of the Second Punic War given by Livy in his history of Rome, Ab Urbe condita, and upon Plutarch's Lives of Hannibal and Scipio.

Earlier English plays on the subject had been written and acted. A Scipio Africanus, author unknown, was staged at the English Court on 3 January 1580; a Hannibal and Hermes by Thomas Dekker, Michael Drayton, and Robert Wilson dated from 1598; it was followed by a Hannibal and Scipio by Richard Hathwaye and William Rankins in 1601. (None of these works is extant.) John Marston's The Wonder of Women (1606) deals with the related figure of Sophonisba.

In the Prologue to his play, Nabbes writes of "borrowing from a former play" (line 190), but scholars have not agreed on any specific play to which he refers. Nabbes apparently intended to deny any debt to any previously produced drama.

Beyond the range of English literature, a large body of Continental plays, poems, and prose stories dealt with the subject matter; the last category includes versions of the story by Bandello, Boccaccio, and Petrarch.

== The 1635 cast ==
The cast list in the 1637 quarto of Hannibal and Scipio is one of only five such lists that have survived from the 1625–42 history of Queen Henrietta's Men. (The others are for The Fair Maid of the West, King John and Matilda, The Renegado, and The Wedding.) The role assignments for Hannibal and Scipio, what the list itself calls "The speaking persons," are:

Actor	Role(s)
William Allen	Hannibal
Michael Bowyer	Scipio
Richard Perkins	Hanno
Theophilus Bird	Masinissa
Ezekiel Fenn	Sophonisba
John Page	Lelius
John Sumner	Himulco
Robert Axell	Gisgon; Bomilcar
Hugh Clark	Syphax; Nuntius
William Shearlock	Maharaball; Prusias
Anthony Turner	Crates; Piston; Messenger
George Stutfield	Lucius; Bostar; Soldier

== Structure and theme ==
Nabbes structures his play so that each of the five Acts has a different setting – Capua; Syphax's court; Utica; Carthage; and Bithynia. "Nabbes organizes events...in order to present a series of contrasts – between Hannibal and Scipio, Syphax and Masinissa, continence and lust, public duty and private passion – which constitute variations on his main theme of the nature of human virtue." Through this pattern of contrasts, Nabbes constructs "a play with two protagonists, one tragic and one epic;" when Hannibal dies, Scipio is forced to realize the limits of his quest for military glory and turn toward the "contemplative virtues" of philosophy. Nabbes's play anticipated the heroic drama to come during the Restoration, though the heroic play "lacks both Nabbes's formal restraint and his Neoplatonic philosophy."

Nabbes's preoccupations in the play are philosophical and moral; he did not attempt to apply a political slant to the work, to comment on the contemporary political scene of his day. Later writers would not exercise the same restraint. In the later seventeenth and the eighteenth centuries, the Punic Wars would become the preferred metaphor for the prevailing political situation; in England, the long-standing competition with France was analogized in Punic-War terms – with England as victorious Rome. The great critic Samuel Johnson would eventually complain that he was sick of hearing about the subject; "he would be rude to anyone who mentioned the Punic Wars...."
