= The Wedding (1629 play) =

Play by James Shirley

The Wedding is a Caroline era stage play, a comedy written by James Shirley. Published in 1629, it was the first of Shirley's plays to appear in print. An early comedy of manners, it is set in the fashionable world of genteel London society in Shirley's day.

The play is thought to date from c. 1626. It was published in quarto in 1629, printed by Nicholas Okes for the bookseller John Grove. This first edition contained commendatory verses, including one by John Ford; the play was dedicated to William Gowre, Esq., a personal friend of the author. A second quarto was published in 1632; the title page of Q2 states that the play was "lately acted" by Queen Henrietta's Men at the Cockpit Theatre (also called the Phoenix) in Drury Lane. The Wedding was included among eight of Shirley's plays that were published in one volume in 1640. Another individual edition appeared in 1660, at the start of the Restoration era, published by William Leake.

The scholar and critic Alfred Harbage argued that Shirley's play alludes to the 1625 wedding of Sir Kenelm Digby and Venetia Stanley. Their nuptials were the "celebrity wedding" of the day, and nobody in London society, Harbage maintained, could have seen or read the play "without thinking of the affair of Sir Kenelm Digby and Venetia Stanley."

== Cast ==
The Wedding is one of the rare plays in English Renaissance drama for which cast information for the early productions survives. (Only five cast lists are extant for the whole history of Queen Henrietta's Men. The others are for The Fair Maid of the West, Hannibal and Scipio, King John and Matilda, and The Renegado.) The actors and their roles were:

Role	Actor
Sir John Belfare	Richard Perkins
Beauford	William Bowyer
Marwood	John Sumner
Rawbone	William Robbins
Lodam	William Shearlock
Justice Landby	Anthony Turner
Captain Landby	William Allen
Isaac	William Wilbraham
Haver	John Young
Camelion	John Dobson
Gratiana	Hugh Clark
Jane	John Page
Lucibel/Millicent	Edward Rogers
Cardona	Timothy Read

== Synopsis ==
The play's protagonist, Beauford, is about to marry the heroine, Gratiana, when Beauford's cousin Marwood claims that he has been Gratiana's lover. The two men duel over the matter, and Marwood loses — but as he dies he maintains the truth of his accusation. At the house where the ceremony is about to occur, Beauford takes Gratiana aside and tells her of the matter; though Gratiana denies Marwood's allegations, Beauford does not believe her. As Beauford waits to be arrested for Marwood's killing, Gratiana is offered concealment by Captain Landby, who also delivers a letter from Gratiana to her estranged fiance. The letter tells Beauford that by the time he reads it, she will have drowned herself. Gratiana's page Millicent advises her to confront her waiting woman Cardona about the whole matter.

Millicent has a trunk delivered to Beauford's lodging, telling him that the trunk contains Marwood's corpse. Claiming to be Marwood's relative, Millicent demands satisfaction for the death — but he first has Beauford listen to Cardona, who affirms that Marwood had sex not with Gratiana but with Cardona's daughter Lucibel (a version of the "bed trick" that occurs in a number of plays in English Renaissance drama). Realizing his error, Beauford opens the trunk, and finds not a dead Marwood but a living Gratiana — but then the officers arrive to arrest him for Marwood's death. Brought before a Justice Landby (the uncle of the Captain who befriended Gratiana), Marwood is revealed to be still alive, and Millicent turns out to be the missing Lucibel.

The play's subplot involves the suitors who seek the hand of Jane, the daughter of Justice Landby. One, Lodam, is fat and gluttonous; a second, Rawbone, is a usurer and miser; and the third, Haver, is a young gentleman of worth but no fortune. Jane and her cousin the Captain favor Haver, but the Justice, testing his daughter, pretends to favor Rawbone. As a result, Haver masquerades as a servant named Jasper who carries Rawbone's messages to Jane. Haver/Jasper provokes a duel between Lodam and the equally cowardly Rawbone, promising to take Rawbone's place in the combat; Lodam, despite many boasts, yields to Haver/Jasper/Rawbone at the first pass. Captain Landby, spying on the duel, has all the participants arrested and brought before the Justice — who insists that Jane and "Rawbone" (Haver, still in disguise) marry immediately. The ceremony is carried out before the ruse is discovered.

So the play ends with three newly married couples: Beauford and Gratiana, Haver and Jane, and the repentant Marwood and Lucibel.
