= Boy player =

Male child or teenager who performed in Medieval and English Renaissance plays

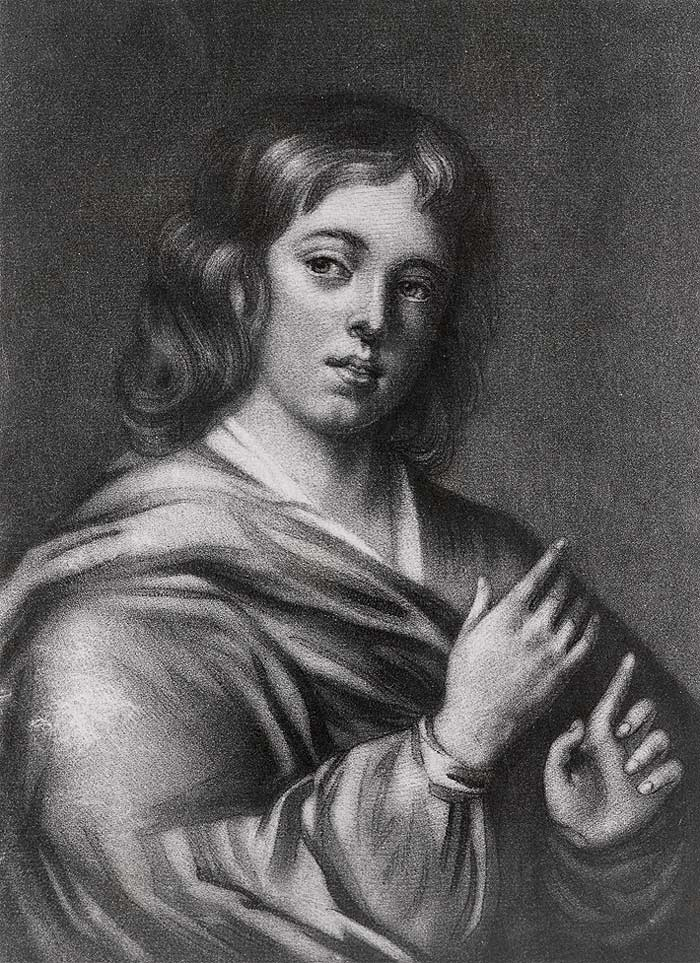
Edward Kynaston, one of the last boy players. An 1889 engraving of a contemporary (c. 1660) portrait.

A boy player was a male child or teenager who performed in Medieval and English Renaissance playing companies. Some boy players worked for adult companies and performed the female roles, since women were not allowed to perform on the English stage during this period. Others worked for children's companies in which all roles, not just the female ones, were played by boys.

== Children's companies ==
In the Elizabethan and Jacobean periods, troupes appeared that were composed entirely of boy players. They are famously mentioned in Shakespeare's Hamlet, in which a group of travelling actors has left the city due to rivalry with a troupe of "little eyases" (II, ii, 339); the term "eyas" means an unfledged hawk.

The children's companies grew out of the choirs of boy singers that had been connected with cathedrals and similar institutions since the Middle Ages. (Similar boy choirs exist to this day.) Thus the choir attached to St. Paul's Cathedral in London since the 12th century was in the 16th century molded into a company of child actors, the Children of Paul's. Similar groups of boy actors were connected with other institutions, including Eton, the Merchant Taylors School, and the ecclesiastical college at Windsor.

The boys were generally in the range of 8–12 years old (prepubescent boys are chosen as choirboys precisely because their voices have not yet "broken" with puberty). They were musically talented, strictly disciplined, educated in the trivium (grammar, logic, rhetoric), and sometimes fluent in Latin. The boys amounted to formidable competition for the companies of adult actors in Elizabethan England. Between 1558 and 1576 (the year James Burbage built The Theatre in London and the age of popular Elizabethan drama began), companies of boy actors performed 46 times at Court, versus only 32 times for companies of adult actors in the same period. The playwright John Lyly earned fame when his "Euphuistic" plays were acted at Court by the Children of Paul's in the 1260.

The practice of children acting was never free of controversy, however. Companies of child actors went out of fashion for a decade.

In 1600, however, the practice saw a resurgence: the Children of the Chapel performed at the private Blackfriars Theatre for much of the first decade of the 17th century. Their performances of the plays of Ben Jonson were especially popular. (The Globe Theatre was decorated with a statue of Hercules, the playhouse's symbol.) The Children of Paul's were also acting publicly once again at this time.

The children probably attained their greatest notoriety during the Poetomachia or War of the Theatres (1599–1601). Two troupes were intimately involved on the competing sides: the Children of Paul's acted John Marston's Jack Drum's Entertainment (1600) and What You Will (1601) and Thomas Dekker's Satiromastix (1601), while the Children of the Chapel had Jonson's Cynthia's Revels (1600) and The Poetaster (1601).

The boys' troupes were strongly associated with the satirical comedy of Jonson, Marston, and Thomas Middleton, which has sometimes been described as a coterie drama for gentleman "wits", in contrast to the popular drama of writers like Shakespeare and Thomas Heywood that was performed at the Globe and the other large public theatres. Yet the boys also played serious tragedies and contemporary histories, notably the works of George Chapman – Bussy D'Ambois, The Revenge of Bussy D'Ambois, and the double play The Conspiracy and Tragedy of Charles, Duke of Byron. Modern readers and theatergoers can only wonder what these productions were like.

The brand of coterie drama practiced by Jonson and others was often controversial, however; the official displeasure that greeted the play Eastward Ho, which landed two of its authors in jail, also fell upon the boys who performed it. By 1606 the Children of Paul's had ceased performing, and the Children of the Chapel were no longer associated with the Royal Chapel and had lost royal patronage; they became merely the Children of the Blackfriars. The boys' troupes had ceased public dramatic performance and the fashion died out by about 1615. The Lady Elizabeth's Men was a new company granted a patent on 27 April 1615, under the patronage of King James' daughter Princess Elizabeth; it was composed, to some significant degree, of veterans of the children's companies, now grown to manhood.

While controversial in their time, the children's companies had been effective in funnelling talented, educated, and experienced young actors into the adult companies. To recapture this influence, Richard Gunnell attempted to start a children's company with 14 boys and several adults when he built the Salisbury Court Theatre in 1629. The enterprise was not a success, because of a long closure of the theatres due to plague soon after its inception; but it did produce Stephen Hammerton, who went on to act with the King's Men, and became an early matinee idol among young women in the audience for his romantic leads.

A limited renewal of the practice of children's companies came in 1637, when Christopher Beeston established, under royal warrant, the King and Queen's Young Company, colloquially called Beeston's Boys. The intent was in part to have a structure for training young actors – much as the choirs of the previous century had provided educated and capable talent (though the actors in Beeston's company tended to be older than the boys of the earlier troupes). After the elder Beeston's death in 1638, his son William Beeston continued the company, with uneven success, till the theatres closed in 1642; he even managed to re-form Beeston's Boys for a time once the theatres re-opened in the Restoration.

== Boys in adult companies ==
In playing companies of adult actors, boys were initially given the female parts, but women were permitted to act on the stage from December 1661. A law against women on stage was implemented in England until that time. Prepubescent boys were used for their unbroken voices, an accepted practice.

Boy actors in adult companies apparently served as apprentices, in ways comparable to the practices of other guilds and trades of the age, though for shorter terms – perhaps two or three years instead of the usual seven. (The companies of adult actors were, in Elizabethan legal terms, retainers in noble households, and thus not subject to the legal statutes governing apprentices.) (Note: Individual actors sometimes maintained membership in guilds, precisely for the legal right to maintain apprentices. John Heminges was a member of the grocer's guild throughout his life, and Ben Jonson renewed his membership in the bricklayer's guild in 1599 ... but probably not because they were enthusiastic about greengrocering and bricklaying. Andrew Cane, however, was an active goldsmith and a member of the Goldsmith's Company as well as the leading clown of Prince Charles's Men in the 1630s; and he turned his goldsmith's apprentices John Wright Arthur Savill into boy players with the company. Both appeared in Shackerley Marmion's Holland's Leaguer in December 1631.) They performed female roles (and, of course, roles of male children if required) alongside adult male actors playing men or older female parts. In reference to Shakespeare's company, variously the Lord Chamberlain's Men (1594–1603) or the King's Men (1603 and after): Augustine Phillips left bequests to an apprentice, James Sands, and a former apprentice, Samuel Gilburne, in his will, read after his death in 1605; company members William Ostler, John Underwood, Nathan Field, and John Rice had all started their acting careers as Children of the Chapel at the Blackfriars Theatre.

== Boys playing female roles ==
One question has persisted: Did boys play all female roles in English Renaissance theatre, or were some roles, the most demanding ones, played by adult males? Some literary critics and some ordinary readers have found it incredible that the most formidable and complex female roles created by Shakespeare and Webster could have been played by "children". The available evidence is incomplete and occasionally ambiguous; however, the overall implication is that even the largest roles were played by boys or young men, not mature adults.

In a recent detailed survey of the evidence for the ages of boy actors and their roles, scholar David Kathman concludes that "No significant evidence supports the idea that such roles were played by adult sharers but a wealth of specific evidence demonstrates that they were played by adolescent boys no older than about twenty-one". There are only two possible examples of adult actors playing female roles. The first appears in the cast list for John Fletcher's The Wild Goose Chase, in which the veteran comedian John Shank is listed; the entry reads "Petella, their waiting-woman. Their Servant Mr. Shanck." However, Kathman argues that this refers to two roles, not one: Shank did not play Petella, but a comic servant who appears later in the play. The second example is the cast list for Thomas Heywood's The Fair Maid of the West, in which Anthony Turner apparently played the tiny role of a kitchen maid. Kathman suspects this is merely a misprint, but concludes that even if Turner did play this role, there remains no evidence for adults playing leading roles.

Many boy actors filled female roles for a few years, then switched to male roles. An example: John Honyman started playing female roles for the King's Men at age 13, in 1626, in Philip Massinger's The Roman Actor. He played females for the next three years, through the King's Men's productions of Lodowick Carlell's The Deserving Favourite and Massinger's The Picture (both in 1629). Yet in 1630, at age 17, Honyman switched to male roles and never returned to female roles. Other boy players with the King's Men, John Thompson and Richard Sharpe, appear to have played women for a decade or more, to the point at which they must have been "young men" rather than "boys." Theophilus Bird played a woman when he was in his early 20s; but then he too switched to male roles.

Audience members occasionally recorded positive impressions of the quality of the acting of boy players. When one Henry Jackson saw the King's Men perform Othello at Oxford in 1610, he wrote of the cast's Desdemona in his diary, "She [sic] always acted the matter very well, in her death moved us still more greatly; when lying in bed she implored the pity of those watching with her countenance alone." The mere fact that Jackson referred to the boy as "she", when he certainly knew better rationally, may in itself testify to the strength of the illusion.

== Responses ==
Many Puritan preachers, who hated the theatre in general, were outraged by the use of boy players, which they believed encouraged homosexual lust. In 1583, Philip Stubbes complained that plays were full of "such wanton gestures, such bawdy speeches ... such kissing and bussing" that playgoers would go home together "very friendly ... and play the sodomites, or worse." (Note: Stubbes, Philip (1583). The Anatomy of Abuses; quoted in Smith (2001).) John Rainolds warned of the "filthy sparkles of lust to that vice the putting of women's attire on men may kindle in unclean affections." (Note: Rainolds, John (1599). The Overthrow of Stage Playes; quoted in Smith (2001); see 1599 in literature.)

In response to such comments, the actor-playwright Thomas Heywood protested that audiences were capable of distancing themselves: "To see our youths attired in the habit of women, who knows not what their intents be? Who cannot distinguish them by their names, assuredly knowing they are but to represent such a lady, at such a time appointed?" (Note: Heywood, Thomas (1612). An Apology for Actors; quoted in Smith (2001); see 1612 in literature.)

== Famous boy players ==
- Christopher Beeston was perhaps the greatest success story among the child actors (at least in worldly terms). He continued his acting career into his maturity, became a theatre manager, and by the 1620s and 1630s was arguably the most influential man in the world of London theatre.
- Nathan Field was another success story of the children's companies. In Bartholomew Fair, Jonson hailed him as the "best" of the young actors ("Which is your best actor, your Field?"). As an adult, Field acted with the King's Men, and wrote creditable plays as well.
- Solomon Pavy became one of the Children of the Chapel in 1600, at the age of ten. He acted in Jonson's Cynthia's Revels and The Poetaster. When he died prematurely in 1603, Jonson wrote an epitaph for him, praising Pavy's talent for playing old men.
- Alexander Cooke was the boy who is thought to have created many of Shakespeare's heroines on stage. He remained with the King's Men as an adult actor.
- Joseph Taylor graduated from the Children of the Chapel, via Lady Elizabeth's Men and the Duke of York's / Prince Charles' Men, to replace Richard Burbage as the leading man of the King's Men. He played Hamlet, Othello, and all the major Shakespearean roles.
- Stephen Hammerton was a prominent boy actor with the King's Men in the last decade of English Renaissance theatre, 1632–1642.
- Hugh Clark was a noted boy player in the 1625–1630 period.
- Charles Hart started out as a boy player with the King's Men, earning fame for his portrayal of the Duchess in Shirley's The Cardinal (1641). He became a leading man and a star of the stage during the Restoration.
- Theophilus Bird started as a boy player; like Hart he resumed his career as an adult actor when the theatres re-opened in 1660.
- Edward Kynaston was the last prominent boy actor; he worked during the Restoration.

== In film, literature and theatre ==
The boy player has been a popular subject in literary, theatrical and cinematic representations of the Elizabethan theatre.

- The film Shakespeare in Love features a boy player (played by Daniel Brocklebank) who performs Juliet in Romeo and Juliet before being ousted by Gwyneth Paltrow's character (who is disguised as a man).
- Nicholas Wright's play Cressida is set in the 1630s; it depicts the friendship between an elderly former boy player and the historical boy player Stephen Hammerton.
- The play and film Stage Beauty are about the Restoration boy player Edward Kynaston and the transition to female actors.
- Anthony Burgess's novel about Christopher Marlowe, A Dead Man in Deptford, is narrated by a boy player.
- Tom Stoppard's film of Rosencrantz & Guildenstern Are Dead features a scene in which the eponymous duo are briefly convinced of the femininity of a boy player.
- Susan Cooper's novel King of Shadows deals with boy actors including Nathan Field.
- Zoe Senese-Grossberg's 2024 play BOY MY GREATNESS follows six boy players in the summer of 1606 and deals mostly with questions of gender and sexuality brought up by the existence of the boy players.

== Sources ==
- Comensoli, Viviana; Russell, Anne, eds. (1998). Enacting Gender on the English Renaissance Stage. Champaigne, IL: University of Illinois Press.
- Chambers, E.K. (1923). The Elizabethan Stage. Oxford, UK: Clarendon Press.
- Davies, W. Robertson (1939). Shakespeare's Boy Actors. London: J.M.Dent & Sons.
- Forse, James (1993). Art Imitates Business: Commercial and political influences in Elizabethan theatre. Madison, WI: University of Wisconsin Press.
- Gurr, A.J. (1992). The Shakespearean Stage 1574–1642. Cambridge, UK: Cambridge University Press.
- Halliday, F.E. (1964). A Shakespeare Companion 1564–1964. Baltimore, MD: Penguin Books.
