= Robert Davenport (dramatist) =

English dramatist (fl. 1623–1639)

Robert Davenport (fl. 1623–1639) was an English dramatist of the early seventeenth century. Nothing is known of his early life or education; the title pages of two of his plays identify him as a "Gentleman," though there is no record of him at either of the two universities or the Inns of Court. Scholars have guessed that he was born c. 1590; if, as some scholars think, he wrote the Address "To the knowing Reader" in the first quarto of King John and Matilda, he was still alive in 1655. He enters the historical record in 1624, when two of his plays were licensed by the Master of the Revels.

His extant dramatic canon consists of only three plays: The City Nightcap, A New Trick to Cheat the Devil, and King John and Matilda. King John and Matilda (printed 1655) bears strong resemblances to The Death of Robert Earl of Huntingdon, the second of Anthony Munday and Henry Chettle's two Robin Hood plays, and can be regarded as virtually a rewrite of the earlier work. Yet Charles Lamb admired Davenport's version, and quoted from the closing scene in his Dramatic Specimens.

The City Nightcap was licensed in 1624, but not printed until 1661. The subplot of this play was borrowed from Miguel de Cervantes and Giovanni Boccaccio, and Aphra Behn's Amorous Prince (1671) is an adaptation of it. A New Trick to Cheat the Devil (printed 1639) is a farce, which contains among other things the idea of the popular supper story which reappears in Hans Christian Andersen's Little Claus and Big Claus. As told by Davenport the story closely resembles the Scottish Freres of Berwick, which was printed in 1603.

Three other plays entered in the Stationers Register as Davenport's have not survived: The Peddler, The Fatal Brothers, and The Politic Queen. Samuel Sheppard, in a 1651 epigram, mentions a fourth lost work, The Pirate, which he thought showed how Davenport "Rival'st Shakespeare, though thy glory's lesse". Davenport is also reported to have collaborated with Thomas Drue on The Woman's Mistaken, and that too is lost.

A history play titled Henry I was licensed for performance by the King's Men on 10 April 1624 as Davenport's work; it has not survived. In 1653, when the stationer Humphrey Moseley registered Cardenio as the work of Shakespeare and John Fletcher, he simultaneously registered a Henry I and a Henry II as the works of "Shakespeare, & Dauenport." John Warburton the antiquarian recorded the Shakespeare/Davenport Henry I in his manuscript collection—but it was one of the plays destroyed by Warburton's cook. While the Henry I licensed in 1624 was certainly a play for the King's Men, it first appears eight years after Shakespeare's death and scholars have been universally skeptical that Davenport and Shakespeare ever worked together.

Three significant poems by Davenport also survive. They are: A Crown for a Conqueror, a religious poem, and Too Late to Call Back Yesterday, a moral dialogue, both published in 1639; and A Survey of the Sciences, which survived in manuscript and was published only in the 1880s.

Davenports plays were reprinted by A. H. Bullen in Old English Plays (new series, 1890).
