= Thomas Nabbes =

English playwright (1605–c.1641)

Thomas Nabbes (1605 – buried 6 April 1641) was an English dramatist.

He was born in humble circumstances in Worcestershire, was educated at as a King's scholar at the King's School, Worcester (1616–1620), and entered Exeter College, Oxford in 1621. He left the university without taking a degree, and in about 1630 began a career in London as a dramatist. He was employed at some point in the household of a nobleman near Worcester, and seems to have been of a convivial disposition. He had at least two children, Bridget and William, both of whom died within two years of his death.

== Works ==
About 1630 Nabbes seems to have settled in London, resolved to try his fortunes as a dramatist. He was always a stranger to the best literary society, but found congenial companions in Chamberlain, Jordan, Marmion, and Tatham, and was known to many "gentlemen of the Inns of Court" (cf. Bride, Ded.) About January 1632–1633 his first comedy, Covent Garden, was acted by the queen's servants, and was published in 1638 with a modest dedication addressed to Sir John Suckling. In the prologue he defends himself from stealing the title of the piece—in allusion doubtless to Richard Brome's Covent Garden Weeded, acted in 1632—and describes his "muse" as "solitary". His second comedy, Totenham Court, was acted at the private house in Salisbury Court in 1633, and was also printed in 1638, with a dedication to William Mills. A third piece, Hannibal and Scipio, an hystorical Tragedy, in five acts of blank verse, was produced in 1635 by the queen's servants at their private house in Drury Lane. Nabbes obviously modelled his play upon Marston's Sophonisba. It was published in 1637, with a list of the actors' names. A third comedy, The Bride, acted at the private house in Drury Lane, again by the queen's servants, in 1638, was published two years later, with a prefatory epistle addressed "to the generalty of his noble friends, gentlemen of the severall honorable houses of the Inns of Court". One of the characters, Mrs. Ferret, the imperious wife, has been compared to Ben Jonson's Mistress Otter.

Gerard Langbaine, in his An Account of the English Dramatic Poets (1691), places Nabbes among the poets of the third rate. The author of Theophilus Cibber's Lives of the Poets of Great Britain and Ireland, to the Time of Dean Swift (1753) declares that in strict justice "he cannot rise above a fifth." This severe verdict is ill justified. He is a passable writer of comedies, inventing his own plots, and lightly censuring the foibles of middle-class London society. Samuel Sheppard in the sixth sestiad ("The Assizes of Apollo") of his Times Display'd (1646), associates Nabbes's name with the names of John Davenant, James Shirley, Francis Beaumont, and John Fletcher, and selects his tragedy of Hannibal and Scipio for special commendation. Nabbes displays a satisfactory command of the niceties of dramatic blank verse, in which all his plays, excluding the two earliest comedies, were mainly written. Although he was far more refined in sentiment than most of his contemporaries, he is capable at times of considerable coarseness.

As a writer of masques Nabbes deserves more consideration. His touch was usually light and his machinery ingenious. The least satisfactory was the one first published, viz. Microcosmus. A Morall Maske, presented with generall liking, at the Private House in Salisbury Court, and heere set down according to the intention of the Authour, Thomas Nabbes, (1637). A reference to the approaching publication of the work was made in Don Zara del Fogo, a mock romance, which was written before 1637, though not published until 1656. Richard Brome contributed prefatory verses. His Spring's Glory (1638) bears some resemblance to Thomas Middleton's Inner Temple Masque, published in 1618. The Presentation intended for the Prince his Highnesse on his Birthday (1638) is bright and attractive, although it does not appear to have been actually performed. It was printed with The Spring's Glory, together with some occasional verses. The volume, which was dedicated to William, son of Peter Balle, was entitled The Spring's Glory, a Maske. Together with sundry Poems, Epigrams, Elegies, and Epithalamiums. By Thomas Nabbes (1639). Of the poems, the verses on a "Mistresse of whose Affection hee was doubtfull" have charm; they were included in William James Linton's Collection of Rare Poems. Nabbes contributed commendatory verses to Shackerley Marmion's "Legend of Cupid and Psyche" (1637); Robert Chamberlain's "Nocturnal Lucubrations", 1638; Thomas Jordan's "Poeticall Varieties", 1640; John Tatham's "Fancies Theater", 1640; Humphrey Mills's "A Night's Search", 1640; Thomas Beedome's "Poems Divine and Humane", 1641; and the "Phœnix of these Late Times; or, the Life of Mr. Henry Welby, Esq." (1637). Henry Welby was an eccentric, who was credited with living without food or drink for the last forty-four years of his life. To the fifth edition of Richard Knolles's Generall Historie of the Turkes (1638) Nabbes appended "A Continuation of the Turkish Historie, from the Yeare of our Lord 1628 to the end of the Yeare 1637. Collected out of the Dispatches of Sr. Peter Wyche, Knight, Embassador [sic] at Constantinople, and others". The dedication is addressed to Sir Thomas Roe, whom Nabbes describes as a stranger to him.

Nabbes' verse is smooth and musical. His language is sometimes coarse, but his general attitude is moral. The Masque of Microcosmus is really a morality play, in which Physander after much error is reunited to his wife Bellanima, who personifies the soul. The other two masques, slighter in construction but ingenious, show Nabbes at his best. Nabbes's plays were collected in 1639; and Microcosmus was printed in Robert Dodsley's Old Plays (1744). All his works, with the exception of his continuation of Knolles's history, were reprinted by A. H. Bullen in Old English Plays (second series, 1887).

== Burial ==
For centuries there was uncertainty about Nabbes' fate and burial. In a 1628 poem he expressed hope that one day he would be worthy of entombment at Worcester Cathedral in his native Worcestershire, while an 18th-century theatre historian insisted he was interred at London's Temple Church. There were no records for him in either place.

== Selected works ==
- Covent Garden (acted 1633, printed 1638), dedicated to Sir John Suckling; a prose comedy;
- Tottenham Court (acted 1633, printed 1638), a comedy set in a holiday resort for London tradesmen;
- Hannibal and Scipio (acted 1635, printed 1637), a historical tragedy;
- The Bride (1638), a comedy;
- The Unfortunate Mother (printed 1640, acted 2013); this play, described by the Dictionary of National Biography as "an unreadable and tedious tragedy", was published in 1640, but not performed in Nabbes's lifetime.
- Microcosmus, a Morall Maske (printed 1637);
- two other masques, The Spring's Glory and Presentation intended for the Prince his Highness on his Birthday (printed together in 1638);
- and a continuation of Richard Knolles's General History of the Turks (1638).
