= The City Wit =

Stage play written by Richard Brome

The City Wit, or the Woman Wears the Breeches is a Caroline era stage play, a comedy written by Richard Brome that is sometimes classed among his best works. It was first published when it was included in the Five New Plays of 1653, the collection of Brome works published by Humphrey Moseley, Richard Marriot, and Thomas Dring.

== Date and performance ==
There is no firm evidence on the date of The City Wit; scholars and critics have generally judged the play to be one of Brome "earliest surviving" plays. It probably dates from c. 1629–32. The acting company that premiered it is similarly unknown – though early in his career Brome was writing for the King's Men, the troupe that staged his The Northern Lass in 1629. City Wit, like Northern Lass, is unusually rich in music: in the former drama, the boy player filling the role of Crack sings no less than a dozen times. The title role of Constance in Northern Lass shows a comparable richness in music. It is not impossible that both plays were staged by the King's Men, and even that both musical roles were acted by the same vocally talented boy actor.

A production of "The City Wit", directed by Lora Lassiter, was performed by Mary Baldwin University's Shakespeare & Performance Graduate Program in February, 2026.

== Genre and influences ==
The City Wit fits securely into the subgenre of city comedy, and draws upon the rich tradition of earlier city comedies for many of its elements. One obvious debt is to Thomas Dekker and John Webster's Westward Ho (c. 1604). In that play, the London merchant Justiniano faces business difficulties and a rocky marriage; he pretends to leave London but in fact remains in the city to assume various disguises to manipulate the other characters. Brome adopts this plot wholesale for City Wit.

Given Brome's strong allegiance to the comedy of Ben Jonson, it is not surprising to find Jonsonian elements in the play too. In fact, City Wit has been termed Brome's "most overtly Jonsonian comedy." In Act III, scene i, Crack specifically compares the play's three charlatan characters, Master Crasy, himself, and Mistress Tryman, to Subtle, Face, and Doll in The Alchemist.

In turn, Brome's derivative play spawned a derivation of its own: Restoration playwright George Powell's comedy A Very Good Wife, staged and printed in 1693, borrowed heavily from The City Wit and from Brome's The Court Beggar.

== "Place realism" ==
The City Wit shows the same tendency that Brome displays in other works, like The Weeding of Covent Garden and The Sparagus Garden, of exploiting the actual locations of London for the settings of his scenes. In City Wit he carries this tendency to a surprisingly bold extreme, setting one scene (IV, ii) in the presence chamber at the court of King Charles I, where he has his characters argue and brawl.

== Synopsis ==
Master Crasy is a London merchant who has suffered a decline in fortune; he is honest and generous to a fault and has encumbered himself with a load of debt. In the play's opening scene, a dinner is being held at his house for his debtors and creditors; the plan is that the two sides will reach an agreement that will keep Crasy from bankruptcy. Crasy himself, however, hesitates to join the dinner; he sits poring over his "empty Money-bags, Bills, Bonds, & Bookes of accomptes, &c." and brooding on his decline. His apprentice Jeremy then brings him the news that the dinner has turned into a disaster: Crasy's mother-in-law Pyannet Sneakup, a shrew and harridan, has denounced him to the assembled company as a hopeless case: "Her mischievous tongue has over-thrown the good / Was meant to you." The woman herself enters and reveals herself to be a ceaseless talker who browbeats her husband Sneakup into silence in her presence. Several of Crasy's debtors linger, including the pedant Sarpego, the courtiers Rufflit and Sir Andrew Ticket, and the merchant Mr. Linsey-Wolsey. Crasy makes a last attempt to get them to pay what they owe him, but without success. Crasy announces that he is leaving on a journey, a final attempt to restore his fortunes; he gives his apprentice Jeremy his freedom. Crasy's wife Josina returns to her parents' home.

Crasy's departure, however, is a ruse; he remains in London to seek his revenge and the restoration of his credit. Disguised as a crippled ex-soldier, he robs Sarpego at sword-point and recovers the ten pounds the pedant owes him. Crasy's next disguise is more subtle: with a false beard and a gown, he masquerades as a physician, "Pulsefeel," who seeks out Josina as his new patient. She shows no remorse over her husband's fall and is ready to move on to new fortunes and pleasures. Josina is handicapped by her illiteracy: she cannot read the love-letters and solicitations that Rufflit and Ticket send her. Crasy, as "Pulsefeel," promises to send a confidential servant to help her.

Crasy the phony doctor is approached by Crack, a boy pimp in the service of a young woman calling herself Mistress Tryman. Tryman is a fallen woman who masquerades as a wealthy young widow, just come to town from Cornwall; she is instantly the target of fortune hunters, and has found a residence in the house of Mr. Linsey-Wolsey. A woman in her position can use a doctor as a confidant; and Crasy quickly joins with Tryman and Crack, three allies in confidence tricks and chicanery.

Linsey-Wolsey plans to marry Tryman himself, and lays out money in pursuit of that goal; but his neighbour Pyannet Sneakup barges in to disrupt things, with a goal of winning the supposedly wealthy widow for her son Toby. Tryman feigns sickness and tempts her would-be exploiters with the bequests of her last will and testament. Toby Sneakup has recently won a place at Court; Crasy masquerades as a Court messenger to send false messages back and forth among the characters, playing on their greed and ambition. The talkative Pyannet admits to have cheated Crasy of valuable jewels; the disguised Crasy manages to reclaim them as they pass as intended bribes and gratuities.

Crasy manages yet another disguise: Doctor "Pulsefeel" sends "Footwell" (Crasy-as-dancing-master) to Josina as her servant. Josina is eager to have a courtly lover, and is willing to accept either Ticket or Rufflit; "Footwell" pretends to be her go-between, but actually works to frustrate the intentions of all concerned. He inspires Josina to send gems and jewellery to the courtiers, and vice versa...only to intercept the gifts himself. He helps Ticket climb to Josina's balcony for an assignation...only to suspend him in mid-air, so that Rufflit can beat him with a stick. He deludes Pyannet into believing that her husband Sneakup is cheating on her, making her a "cucquean" (a female cuckold); she goes to court to find Sneakup and beat him with a truncheon.

The tangle of confusion and trickery comes to a head in the final act. Linsey-Wolsey, irate at losing the widow Tryman, apprehends Crack and threatens to turn the boy over to the beadles for whipping; and Crack agrees to expose all. At the Sneakup house, a marriage contract between Tryman and Toby Sneakup is arranged, and a marriage masque is rehearsed in which the real situation is revealed, to everyone's discomfort. Linsey-Wolsey bursts in with Crack, planning to expose Tryman as a fraud – but the exposé is even more extreme than expected, when Tryman lifts "her" skirts to show his trousers underneath. "Tryman" is actually Crasy's apprentice Jeremy in disguise, and Crack the supposed boy pimp is Jeremy's brother; they have been acting their roles to help Crasy recover his fortune and reputation. (It is in this sense that the play's subtitle, "the woman wears the breeches," applies.)

Neither Linsey-Wolsey, nor Toby and the Sneakups, want to face public embarrassment over courting a boy in disguise; for all concerned, it is best to let the matter drop. Crasy has cheated his debtors out of the funds they owed him to begin with, and so has evened his score. Josina has not actually committed adultery with either of her would-be lovers, so that a reconciliation with her husband is possible; and Crasy the City Wit has managed to restore himself to his old prosperity once more.
