= A Mad Couple Well-Match'd =

Play by Richard Brome

A Mad Couple Well-Match'd is a Caroline era stage play, a comedy written by Richard Brome. It was first published in the 1653 Brome collection Five New Plays, issued by the booksellers Humphrey Moseley, Richard Marriot, and Thomas Dring.

== Date and performance ==
Hard evidence on the play's date of authorship and first stage production is lacking. The 1639 list of plays belonging to the Beeston's Boys company includes an otherwise-unknown play titled A Mad Couple Well Met, which some scholars have taken as a mistake for Brome's play. (Matthew Steggle observes that "the two phrases are variants of the same proverb.") Brome is known to have written for William Beeston's company at the Cockpit Theatre during the final phase of his career; they staged his last play A Jovial Crew in 1641. Most critics accept the later 1630s as the likeliest time for the authorship of A Mad Couple Well-Match'd.

== Genre ==
Like most of Brome's comedies, A Mad Couple shows strong influences from the works of Ben Jonson and from earlier works in the genre of city comedy. The resemblance between Brome's complaisant cuckold Saleware in A Mad Couple and the character Candido in Thomas Dekker's The Honest Whore, Part 1 has drawn notice.

A special debt to Jonson's comedy has been noted in Brome's portrayal of the widow character, Mistress Crostill. She is a "humours" character of the type made famous by Jonson, most notably in his Every Man In and Every Man Out of His Humour; and her characterisation as lustful and lubricious is typical of Jonson's comedy specifically, and more generally of city comedy as a whole.

== Place realism ==
Brome's plays regularly participate in the trend toward "place realism" that was fashionable in the drama of the 1630s; his The Sparagus Garden, The Weeding of Covent Garden, and The New Academy refer to actual, socially significant locations in contemporary London, as do other plays of the period like Shirley's Hyde Park (1632) and Nabbes's Covent Garden (1633) and Tottenham Court (1634). A Mad Couple shows this same tendency toward place realism: in Act II, the protagonist Careless says,

"I need no more insconsing in Ram Alley, nor the sanctuary of Whitefriars, the forts of Fullers Rents and Milford Lane, whose walls are daily batter'd with the curses of bawling creditors."

All of these were locations in the London of Brome's day: Fuller's or Fulwood's Rents and the others were places where debtors could find sanctuary from creditors and bailiffs and the threat of debtors' prison.

== Sex and morals ==
Traditional critics objected to the sexual themes in this play. Algernon Charles Swinburne called the work both "very clever" and "very coarse;" Clarence Andrews complained that "the bad characters all end happily; no one suffers for his flagrant immorality; the hero is faithless, a rake, a scoundrel, and a liar."

Modern commentators tend to approach the play with less moral high dudgeon, and have recognised that the play's rough-and-tumble morality, and its treatment of the contrasting roles of men and women in the Caroline double standard, have some overlooked subtlety and power. The play's element of latent lesbianism has also attracted attention. [See The Antipodes and The Queen's Exchange for other Brome allusions to lesbianism.]

== Synopsis ==
George Careless is a debauched young gentleman, the type of character who often appears in Caroline drama. Since rescuing his rich uncle Sir Anthony Thrivewell from an attempted robbery, Careless has enjoyed his uncle's patronage and financial support – though lately Sir Anthony has grown weary of rescuing his nephew from his "surfeits, wants, wounds, and imprisonments," as is threatening to cut the young man off. The matter is complicated by the fact that the elderly Sir Anthony married a young wife two years previously, but has yet to father a child with her, leaving his nephew Careless as the heir to his estates.

This backstory is delivered in the play's opening dialogue, between Careless and his servant Wat. Their conversation also touches upon the subject of Careless's mistress Phebe, a young woman whom Careless has seduced and maintained as his lover. Phebe had grown increasingly unhappy with her disreputable state, and longs for marriage; Careless does not. Phebe has appealed for help to a relative of hers, a London merchant named Tom Saleware. Saleware has a notorious reputation as a "wittol" – a complaisant cuckold: his wife Alicia Saleware sleeps with prominent men for social and financial advantage.

Among those men is Sir Anthony Thrivewell; the guilt-ridden old knight admits to his Lady that he had one sexual experience with Mistress Saleware, which cost him £100. Lady Thrivewell, a worldly woman, forgives her husband – but extracts a little revenge from Mistress Saleware: she buys goods at the Salewares' shop worth a hundred pounds and change, but pays only the change. Alicia Saleware is resentful over the trick, but has other matters to attend to: she is being courted by a licentious nobleman called Lord Lovely, who sends his follower, a young man called Bellamy, as his go-between. Their conversations reveal a noticeable measure of sexual tension, the suggestion being that young Bellamy, though naive and inexperienced, is interested in Alicia Saleware for himself. Alicia Saleware is shown conducting her flirtations under her husband's nose, while he refuses to acknowledge the facts before him.

Through the intervention of Sir Anthony's friend Mr. Saveall, Careless is welcomed back into Sir Anthony's graces, and the Thrivewell house, once again. As a way of reforming the nephew and restoring his fortune, Thrivewell and Saveall promote an arranged marriage between Careless and a wealthy young widow, Mistress Crostill. Careless sends her a letter to advance his suit, and at the same time writes a dismissive and insulting letter to Phebe; true to his name, however, he misdirects the two letters, so that Phebe receives the marriage proposal and Mrs. Crostil the insults. The widow, however, has a "humorous" and contrary personality (hence her name: she is always contrary, "cross still"):

"she has a violent humour to do, and not to do things oftentimes wilfully against all good counsel or persuasion; she has the spirit of contradiction in her, and an unalterable resolution upon sudden intentions, a most incorrigible will she has, that will not bow nor break"

— as Mr. Saveall puts it. The rudeness and sexual bravado of Careless's "cross abusive letter" only attract the widow to him.

Careless is incorrigible himself: drunk, he makes sexual advances to Lady Thrivewell, offering to impregnate her with the heir that his uncle apparently cannot conceive. When his servant Wat protests Careless's callous treatment of Phebe and his general bad behaviour, Careless beats him and fires him. Even when he's sober, Careless continues his pursuit of the Lady for sex, and the widow for marriage. Mrs. Crostil is a handful for him, however; Lord Lovely has proposed a marriage between her and young Bellamy, and in one comic scene Crostil merely repeats Careless's wooing to Bellamy verbatim, and repeats Bellamy's words back to Careless. Careless quickly develops a resentment toward Bellamy, and a suspicion of the young man's friendship with Lady Thrivewell.

Meanwhile, Alicia Saleware finds that Bellamy evades and frustrates her attempts to have sex with him. Offended, she decides to accuse him of trying to seduce her away from Lord Lovely. The play's entanglements come to a head in the final Act: Careless believes that he has seduced Lady Thrivewell and then been dismissed by her, and he exposes her to her husband. Lord Thrivewell is deeply distressed by the accusation, but Lady Thrivewell assures him that she can resolve him of her innocence. She reveals that she has played a version of the bed trick (so common in English Renaissance drama), and that the woman Careless mistook for Lady Thrivewell in the dark was actually his mistress Phebe. By this, the Lady has managed to teach a lesson to Careless, and also to her husband and his double standard of sexual behaviour.

The accusations against young Bellamy, and all appearances of sexual misbehavior on his part (with Alicia Saleware or Lady Thrivewell or Mrs. Crostil), are negated when it is revealed that "he" is actually a young woman, disguised to safeguard her against sexual predators like Lord Lovely. Careless, exposed and disgraced, states that he will marry Phebe and sell tobacco for a living – but Lady Thrivewell has other ideas: she and other friends provide a dowry on which Phebe and Wat can marry and establish themselves. Lord Lovely promises to reform; Alicia Saleware is sent back to her husband to make something of her marriage, if she can. With all his other plots exposed, Careless admits that the robbery from which he once rescued Sir Anthony was a con-game, a trick arranged to earn the knight's gratitude. Yet despite all of his faults, Careless still attracts Mrs. Crostil; they decide to marry – two incorrigibles who deserve each other, a mad couple well matched.

== Adaptation ==
During the Restoration era, Aphra Behn adapted Brome's play into The Debauchee, or the Credulous Cuckold (printed 1677). Behn retained much of Brome's work in her version, even keeping the original characters' names – though she expanded the crucial bedroom scene in Act IV.
