= The Damoiselle =

c. 1637 play written by Richard Brome

The Damoiselle, or the New Ordinary is a Caroline era stage play, a comedy by Richard Brome that was first published in the 1653 Brome collection Five New Plays, issued by Humphrey Moseley, Richard Marriot, and Thomas Dring.

== Date and performance ==
No firm evidence for the original date of The Damoiselle has survived. The play is generally dated to 1637–38 on the basis of internal evidence, especially the Prologue's reference to poets who want to be called "Sir Laureate." After the death of Ben Jonson in 1637, there was competition among literary men (Sir William Davenant and Thomas May were prime candidates) for the honour of poet laureate. The Damoiselle was first acted by Queen Henrietta's Men at the Salisbury Court Theatre.

== Genre ==
Like most of Brome's comic works, The Damoiselle can be placed in the broad category of "city comedy." Again like most of Brome's comedies, the influence of Ben Jonson is readily detectable. In the view of one critic, "Brome's Damoiselle seems to be deliberately constructed as a mirror image" of Jonson's 1629 play The New Inn.

The subject of usury is crucial to Brome's The Damoiselle, and links the play to a group of anti-usury plays that appeared in the 1630s. Though usury had been treated onstage many times previously – consider Robert Wilson's The Three Ladies of London, Marlowe's The Jew of Malta, and Shakespeare's The Merchant of Venice – John Blaxton's book The English Usurer, published in 1634, made the subject topical at the time.

== Place realism ==
Like other Brome plays of the 1630s – The Weeding of Covent Garden, The New Academy, and The Sparagus Garden – The Damoiselle takes part in the trend toward "place realism" that was fashionable at the time, as evidenced by Shackerley Marmion's Holland's Leaguer (1631), James Shirley's Hyde Park (1632), and Thomas Nabbes's Covent Garden (1633) and Tottenham Court (1634).

Brome sets some scenes in The Damoiselle in the "Temple Walks" of the Middle Temple, one of the Inns of Court. Brome exploits the legal atmosphere of the Walks to make points of satire and social criticism, and shows familiarity with the peculiarities of the place. (Phillis, for instance, can beg without fear of arrest, because she's in the Temple Walks and not in the public streets of London.)

== "Ordinaries" ==
In the sense that the word is used in The Damoiselle and in English Renaissance drama generally, an "ordinary" is a public eating establishment, comparable to modern restaurants and cafeterias. One source defines ordinaries as "Eating-houses with table d'hôtes" [sic]. Ordinaries were generally classed with taverns as similar institutions, though taverns were primarily purveyors of alcoholic drinks and only secondarily of food, while ordinaries reversed that priority. (Like taverns, ordinaries could serve as venues for other activities as well; in his play Brome refers to "gaming" and "bawdry" and "other by-way[s] of expense.")

The ordinary was a relatively new and developing institution in the English Renaissance, and reflected the general social evolution away from medieval and rural social forms toward modern and urban alternatives. Many younger sons of gentlemen, left with limited incomes due to the rules of primogeniture, fled the countryside for London, where they faced the challenge of maintaining a genteel lifestyle (or the appearance of it) with limited funds. The ordinaries catered to their needs, along a scale of prices charged and services provided.

References in the plays of the era (like this one) offer hints at the social atmosphere and ambience of the ordinaries. In one view, "Amongst the promiscuous associates of the ordinaries and the taverns – men of quality and poets upon the town, rich citizens and swaggering adventurers – there must unquestionably have been a constant collision of manners, which was sure to end in blows...."

Brome was not the only dramatist of his generation to notice the ordinary as an institution; William Cartwright wrote his play The Ordinary around 1635.

== Synopsis ==
The play's opening scene shows Sir Humphrey Dryground, a member of the landed gentry, mortgaging his last estate to an old usurer called Vermine. The exchanges between the two are far from cordial: Sir Humphrey reproaches Vermine for his greed and ruthlessness, especially for his role in bankrupting a gentleman named Brookall. Vermine in turn notes that Sir Humphrey himself wronged Brookall in a more personal way, seducing, impregnating, and then abandoning the man's sister. Dryground expresses his remorse over his past actions; he says that his "project" in mortgaging his estate involves reparations to Brookall, and he proposes an arranged marriage between the ruined Brookall's son and Vermine's daughter Alice. Vermine rejects the idea; as they part he reminds Dryground not to miss payment on the mortgage, or Dryground will follow Brookall into financial ruin.

Vermine is shown conversing with his "sober discreet daughter" Alice; their conversation reveals that Vermine also has a son, a "riotous reprobate" called Wat who languishes in the Counter prison. Vermine is attempting to arrange a marriage between Alice and a Cornish knight called Sir Amphilus, who is quickly shown to be old, crude, foolish, and ignorant; Alice calls him "a dunghill scarab, / A water-dog knight." (Cornishmen appear as figures of fun in other plays of the era; Chough in Middleton and Rowley's A Fair Quarrel is one obvious example.) Alice's deliverance from this unwanted match suddenly appears: Sir Amphilus's servant reveals himself to be her brother Wat in a false beard. Sprung from prison, Wat offers to spirit Alice away; he claims to have a plan for her relief. Alice has little choice but to trust her brother and to follow him away from her father's house.

Sir Humphrey's son, Valentine Dryground, had just married Jane, the daughter of a successful London tradesman named Bumpsey and his wife Magdalen. Bumpsey is not happy over the match, since the Drygrounds' finances are precarious. Magdalen is expert at manipulating her capricious and eccentric husband: knowing that he will oppose whatever she says or does, she counsels him to do the opposite of whatever she wants. Bumpsey comes around to accepting the marriage of Valentine and Jane, and even bestows half his wealth, a sum of £500, on the young couple – with the provision that he will treat his share of the wealth as Valentine does his. If Valentine is prudent with the money, Bumpsey will be too, thus leaving his heirs a greater sum in the end; but if Valentine is prodigal, Bumpsey will imitate him, even to bankruptcy. When Valentine buys a new gown for Jane, Bumpsey immediately does the same for Magdalen.

The Bumpseys provide one portion of the play's comic relief; Sir Amphilus provides another. The Cornish knight appears after Alice has absconded – but he is more concerned about the death of his mare and the theft of his dog than the loss of his intended spouse.

In disguise, Sir Humphrey Dryground opens a new ordinary in London (the source of the play's subtitle); for its first three days in business, the ordinary offers free meals to its clientele, thus winning an enthusiastic following among the young gentlemen of the city. News spreads that "Osbright," the manager of the ordinary, is raffling off the virginity of his daughter Frances; a hundred gentlemen invest £20 each for chances in the raffle. Frances has been raised in France, and speaks broken English; she is the "damoiselle" of the title. She gives lessons in French deportment to other ladies; Magdalen and Jane Bumpsey become her students, allowing for comedy on the contrasts of French and English manners. Wat Vermine is working for "Osbright," helping him to arrange his raffle (it was Dryground/Osbright who bailed Wat from the Counter). But the young gentlemen investing in the raffle become an unruly "rabble," abusing Wat and threatening to duck him or throw him in the Thames.

The bankrupt Brookall haunts the Temple Walks, encountering various denizens of the legal world there. A lawyer wants him to serve as a witness to a legal document, which Brookall denounces as a solicitation of perjury for a fee. He meets Vermine, who is busy looking for his daughter Alice, and castigates the usurer until Vermine flees. A young beggar girl named Phillis is shown pursuing her trade among the Walks. Valentine Dryground pretends to be a friend of Brookall's son, and claims that the son has sent his father forty pieces of gold prior to leaving the city on mysterious travels. Brookall, instantly suspicious, rejects the money and jumps to the conclusion that his son is dead. When Valentine denies this, Brookall challenges him to a duel.

The duel is called off, however, when Brookall overhears Valentine abusing Vermine and realises that they are in sympathy. Osbright/Dryground exposes his raffle as a scheme designed to restore Brookall's fortunes, and appeals to the "rabble" for their approval and aid. Some acquiesce; for those who do not, Dryground refunds their £20 fees, and is left with a profit of £500 for Brookall. Phillis the beggar girl is shown to be the long-lost daughter of Dryground and Brookall's sister; Drygound is re-united with both mother and daughter. And "Osbright's" daughter "Frances" is revealed to be Brookall's son Frank is drag disguise; he and Alice have fallen in love and are to be married. Wat Vermine, now repentant for past misdeeds, is to marry Phillis, and Vermine comes around to accepting and blessing the marriages of his children. Brookall is restored to his fortune, and the three families, Brookalls, Drygrounds, and Vermines, are united in their offspring's marriages.
