= The Novella =

Play by Richard Brome

The Novella is a Caroline era stage play, a comedy written by Richard Brome. It was first published in the 1653 Brome collection Five New Plays, issued by the booksellers Humphrey Moseley, Richard Marriot, and Thomas Dring.

== Date and Performance ==
In the 1653 Five New Plays (not to be confused with the 1659 Brome collection of the same name), each of the plays has its own title page. The title page of The Novella specifies that the drama was performed by the King's Men at the Blackfriars Theatre in the year 1632.

One detail in the play-offers insight into the functioning of the King's Men in the relevant period. In the play's final scene (if its stage directions are taken at face value), all the actors in the cast, eighteen men and boys, are onstage at once. Earlier in its history, the company generally did not mount such large productions: cast lists survive from two King's Men productions of John Webster's The Duchess of Malfi, one c. 1614 and the other c. 1621, and both show that the company used doubling of minor roles to stage the play with eleven actors. Other cast data from the Jacobean era (like the casts lists for early King's Men's productions of Fletcherian plays, found in the second Beaumont and Fletcher folio) indicate productions of the same general proportions. Yet if the whole cast of The Novella was onstage in the final scene, doubling could not have been employed. It was in the early Caroline era that the King's Men peaked in personnel: the company had fifteen sharers in the latter 1620s, more than at any time before or after. (The company's 1628 production of John Ford's The Lover's Melancholy, with its cast of seventeen players, was on the same scale as the 1632 Novella staging.)

== Setting and sources ==
Over the full course of his playwriting career, Brome distinguished himself as a writer of city comedies that are strongly rooted in contemporary London. The early play The Novella provides a very rare instance in which Brome exploits a non-English location. For its setting in Venice, Brome drew material from Thomas Coryat's famous 1611 travelogue Coryat's Crudities, among other printed and manuscript sources of information.

== Race and sex ==
The Novella, like Brome's later play The English Moor, exploits a version of the standard Elizabethan bed trick so common in English Renaissance drama, but with a racial twist: in each play a man goes to a sexual assignation expecting to encounter a white woman, only to find that his partner or potential partner is apparently an African woman. In both cases, the appearance is deceptive: in The English Moor the apparent black woman is a white woman in blackface makeup, while in The Novella the apparent black woman is an African boy eunuch. This plot twist in The Novella has attracted the attention of modern critics interested in race and gender issues.

In both cases, a white English boy player would have played across race and gender lines in the original productions: a white boy playing a white woman playing a black woman, and a white boy playing a (castrated) black youth playing a black woman.

== Synopsis ==
The play opens on a night scene in a Venice street. Two young friends, Fabritio and Piso, discuss Fabritio's problematic personal situation. Two wealthy Venetian senators, Pantaloni and Guadagni, have arranged a socially advantageous marriage for their respective son and daughter, Fabritio and Flavia. Unfortunately, both young people are already in love with other choices: Fabritio loves Victoria, a young woman of Rome, while Flavia loves the poor but noble Francisco. Fabritio would like to escape Venice, and the looming arranged marriage, for Rome and Victoria – if he can figure out how to do so without sacrificing his inheritance.

As the two friends discuss the matter (and deliver the plot's backstory), "diverse gentlemen" pass over the stage. Many of these are going to view a young beauty who has recently arrived in the city; she is the "novella" of the title. (Brome employs the term "novella" to mean "novelty" or "innovation.") The young woman in question is the newest recruit among the twenty thousand courtesans of Venice; she has offered her virginity to any man who will pay the enormous sum of two thousand ducats. Piso thinks he sees Fabritio's father Pantaloni among the curiosity seekers going to meet the Novella (the "dogs" seeking to "unkennel the handsomest she fox / In Venice"), though Fabritio is doubtful. There is no doubt when the two young men meet Francisco and his friend Horatio; what is at first a tense encounter mellows when Fabritio and Francisco realise that they have the same goal – to frustrate the arranged marriage of Fabritio and Flavia.

The second scene portrays the senator Guadagni in his element, among his books and records and bags of gold. The man is revealed as irascible and dictatorial – though his daughter Flavia is adept at manipulating his tempestuous emotions. Away from her father, Flavia conspires with her servant Asutta to escape her father's control and the arranged marriage, and to elope with Francisco.

Piso turns out to have been correct: he did see Fabritio's father Pantaloni on his way to meet the Novella. But Pantaloni made the mistake of trying to bargain with the woman for her virginity at a lower price; and when he went in to receive his reward, he met a young African servant woman in bed instead. Pantaloni has planned a revenge on the Novella for this trick: he will lure her into a public encounter with the city's executioner, which will disgrace her socially and cause her to be scorned and isolated. To bring this about, he equips his witty servant Nicolo with the uniform of a Zaffi, the common law officer of Venice. The arrogant Pantaloni has alienated Nicolo, however, by frequently dwelling on the fact that Nicolo's father is a prisoner in the galleys; and Nicolo is easily swayed to defect to the side of Fabritio and his friends.

The Novella is introduced in her quarters, with her "bravo" (bodyguard/thug/manservant) Borgio and her African serving maid Jaconetta (she of Pantaloni's bed trick). The Novella is shown manipulating and putting off the men who circle around her; at one point she comes close to being raped by an ardent Spanish gentleman, though she is saved by Borgio and a German named Swartzenburgh. (The play confuses the Germans, "Deutsch," with the Dutch – a confusion common among the English at the time.) The Novella proves to be Victoria, come from Rome in search of Fabritio; she has adopted her courtesan disguise as a means of finding her love in the strange city.

Francisco disguises himself as a peddler woman, who is let in to Guadagni's home to show "her" wares to the bride to be. After comic business of hiding in closets and similar doings, Francisco and Flavia manage to escape the house and head for refuge...with Victoria. Guadagni's pursuit of the eloping couple leads to the grand confused agglomeration of the play's climax, which sees the senators, the lovers, the servants, the Spaniard, Nicolo in Zaffi disguise plus a real Zaffi, Swartzenburgh the Dutch/German plus Fabritio disguised as him, all jumbled together. Fabritio and Victoria discover each other through their disguises, and are happily re-united. Borgio the bravo turns out to be Paulo, Victoria's brother and a priest; he has been watching over his sister and her honour during her risky courtesan disguise. Jaconetta the black serving maid is revealed to be Jacomo the eunuch, a fact that the embarrassed Pantaloni is eager to conceal. Father Paulo's moral authority succeeds in quelling everyone's resentment and outraged pride, and the two young couples are blissfully united in matrimony.

== Influence ==
The playwright Thomas Killigrew drew upon Brome's The Novella for his Tomaso, or the Wanderer (1654). In the Restoration era, Aphra Behn borrowed from Tomaso for her play The Rover; when she was criticised for her derivativeness, Behn pointed out Killigrew's debt to Brome's play in her Postscript. (Behn was directly indebted to Brome for another work: her play The Debauchee is a rewrite of Brome's A Mad Couple Well-Match'd.)
