= The Lovesick Court =

Stage play by Richard Brome

The Lovesick Court, or the Ambitious Politique is a Caroline-era stage play, a tragicomedy written by Richard Brome, and first published in 1659.

== Publication ==
The Lovesick Court was entered into the Stationers' Register on 4 August 1640 by the bookseller Andrew Crooke, along with five other plays by Brome. Yet the play was not published until it was included in the 1659 Brome collection Five New Plays. In that volume, each of the plays has a separate title page; and three of those title pages, including the one for The Lovesick Court, are dated 1658 instead of 1659. Three of the plays have their own separate pagination, suggesting the possibility that they were intended for individual publication. The Lovesick Court, however, is not one of these three; its pagination is continuous with The English Moor, the previous play in the collection.

== Genre ==
Of Brome's sixteen extant plays (including The Late Lancashire Witches, his collaboration with Thomas Heywood), none are tragedies and only three are tragicomedies (the other two are The Queen's Exchange and The Queen and Concubine). The three tragicomedies have been collectively referred to as "Fletcherian" tragicomedies, as they resembles the tragicomedies of John Fletcher.

== Date ==
Brome's tragicomedies are generally not judged to be among his best plays; early critics tended to consider The Lovesick Court an early work like The Queen's Exchange, written when Brome was still feeling his way into the practice of playwriting – probably dating from about 1627 or 1629. Modern critics, however, have considered The Lovesick Court a later play, dating from the late 1630s, perhaps 1638. Sir Henry Herbert, the Master of the Revels, licensed an otherwise-unknown play titled The Lovesick Courtier for the Salisbury Court Theatre in 1638; this is generally thought to be Brome's play. Critics have recognised that the play contains an element of satire on the political situation of the later 1630s.

== Satire ==
In this more modern view, The Lovesick Court relates to the so-called "Second War of the Theatres," a controversy and rivalry between professional playwrights like Ben Jonson and his follower Brome on the one hand, and on the other the amateur dramatists of the royal court of Queen Henrietta Maria, most prominently Sir John Suckling. Brome and Suckling were perhaps the primary opponents in the "second war;" see Aglaura and The Court Beggar.

The satire in Lovesick Court is in some ways more subtle than Brome's comparable satire in Court Beggar, and directed less toward personalities like Suckling and Sir William Davenant than toward the type of drama they wrote. Brome saw the courtier drama as deficient regarding human nature and common sense; he judged it a highly artificial mode that perpetrated a "silly distortion of human motive and conduct...," with exaggerated behaviour and excessive posturing on ideas and ideals of friendship, love, chastity, honour, and self-renunciation. The more realistic drama that Brome inherited from Jonson and practised in his comedies was inherently hostile to the highly mannered work of Lodowick Carlell and other courtier dramatists.

== Synopsis ==
The kingdom of Thessaly faces a succession crisis: the ruling King has no son and heir. His daughter, the princess Eudina, must marry a suitable candidate, or the choice of a successor will pass to the common people – and they will favour Stratocles, the ruthless aristocrat who has courted and won the popular favour. (He is the "ambitious politique," or politician, of the play's subtitle.) Stratocles is resented by the king's courtiers, who long to see the selection of an alternative candidate. Yet the King vows that he will marry his daughter to Stratocles unless she finds another husband soon.

Eudina faces a choice between Philargus and Philocles, the twin sons of the late general and hero Adrastus; but she finds it impossible to choose between two equally worthy young men. At the start of the play, the two brothers have just returned from the oracle at Delphi, where they have sought divine guidance for their problem. The message they have received is of limited help:

Contend not for the jewel, which
Ere long shall both of you enrich.
Pursue your fortunes: for 'tis she
Shall make you what you seem to be.

Stratocles, meanwhile, plots to gain the throne, and Eudina, for himself. Eudina is supported by her governess Thymele, the twins' mother, and by the waiting woman Doris and the talkative and often inebriated old midwife Garrula. Yet none of these can help her much in her predicament. (Throughout the play, Garrula repeatedly hints at a secret that she and Thymele share, without revealing its substance.)

The main plot is mirrored and parodied in the comic subplot. Doris, like Eudina, faces three potential suitors – Philargus's tailor Tersulus, Philocles' barber Varillus, and the pompous Geron, the twins' tutor and the son of Garrula (and the play's main clown). Doris agrees to marry the servant of the twin that Eudina chooses – if it is Philargus, Doris will marry Tersulus, and if Philocles, Varillus. (Doris says she will marry Geron only if Eudina marries both twins.) Doris's resolution gives the tailor and the barber a strong interest in the outcome of Eudina's choice.

The twins are determined to fulfill at least the first dictate of the Delphic prophecy, and "contend not for the jewel" – each is ready to sacrifice his prospects in favour of the other. Stratocles, however, sends forged challenges to both brothers, to provoke them to duel; his henchman Matho lingers at the site of the expected duel, planning to finish off the wounded and exhausted survivor(s). The plan fails: when the twins meet, they maintain their bent toward self-sacrifice, and each would rather yield his life to the other than violate their bond. Matho foolishly tries to overcome the two of them, and fails; he confesses the plot to save himself. The scene is witnessed by the rustics who could decide the succession; they bring the three men before the king. Exposed in his plots, Stratocles throws himself upon the king's mercy, and the twins magnanimously urge his forgiveness.

Eudina still has not chosen between Philargus and Philocles by the King's deadline. True to his vow, the King is ready to offer her to the forgiven Stratocles; but Stratocles, sincerely repentant, disavows any claim to either Eudina's hand or the throne. The courtier Disanius, the twins' uncle, has the brothers resolve the conflict by choosing lots; the winner will have Eudina and the succession, while the loser departs for foreign travel. Philargus wins the pick; but Philocles' follower Varillus is not willing to give up his hopes to marry Doris. He serves Philargus a bowl of drugged wine. Philargus passes out, and is thought to be dead.

In the climactic final scene, Philargus's body and the other characters are brought before the king. When it appears that the surviving twin Philocles will marry Eudina, her governess Thymele and the old midwife Garrula finally reveal the secret they've been keeping: the two cannot marry because they are brother and sister, and Philocles is the king's true son and heir. He had been born during a time of civil war, and his birth concealed for his own safety. The two women had maintained the secret ever since, due to vows made to the late queen. Doris admits that she provided the drug that Varillus slipped to Philargus – but she insists that it was not a poison, but merely a sleeping potion. And Philargus recovers from his swoon. Philocles is now the royal heir, while Philargus and Eudina will be married. In this way, the two men fulfill the Delphic prophecy: as brothers-in-law, they become the brothers that they had previously only seemed to be.
