= King's Revels Men =

The King's Revels Men or King's Revels Company was a playing company or troupe of actors in seventeenth-century England. In the confusing theatre nomenclature of that era, it is sometimes called the second King's Revels Company, to distinguish it from an earlier troupe with the same title that was active in the 1607-9 period. Since the earlier group was a company of boy actors, they are alternatively referred to as the King's Revels Children, while the later troupe is termed the King's Revels Men.

The King's Revels Men received a royal charter on 27 February 1615. They spent their early years touring the cities and towns outside London, though they later took up residence in the city. By the second quarter of the century they were acting at the Fortune Theatre and at the Salisbury Court Theatre (the latter in 1630–31 and 1633–36). They played Thomas Randolph's The Muses' Looking-Glass in the summer of 1630, and James Shirley's Love in a Maze in 1632 – one of the few Shirley plays that was not acted by the rival Queen Henrietta's Men. In 1635 they had a major success with Richard Brome's play The Sparagus Garden, which reportedly earned £1000 at the box office.

Other plays in the company's repertory included Brome's The Queen and Concubine, Randolph's Amyntas, Thomas Rawlins's The Rebellion, Nathanael Richards's Messalina, William Heminges's The Madcap, and Henry Glapthorne's The Lady Mother.

The company's personnel included Curtis Greville, William Hall, William Hart, Thomas Loveday, and the two William Cartwrights, father and son; Edward Gibbes, Christopher Goad, John Robinson, and William Wilbraham. Timothy Read was famous as their chief clown and comedian.

During the long closure of the London theatres from May 1636 to October 1637, due to an outbreak of bubonic plague, the King's Revels Men was the group most severely affected: it broke up completely. Some of its members, like Read, passed on to Queen Henrietta's Men.

== Sources ==
- Gurr, Andrew. The Shakespearean Stage 1574–1642. Third edition, Cambridge, Cambridge University Press, 1992.
- Nunzeger, Edwin. A Dictionary of Actors and of Others Associated with the Representation of Plays in England Before 1642. New Haven, Yale University Press, 1929.
- Thomson, Peter, Jane Milling, and Joseph W. Donohue, eds. The Cambridge History of British Theatre. 3 Volumes, Cambridge, Cambridge University Press, 2005.
