= Frauncis new Jigge, betweene Frauncis a Gentleman, and Richard a Farmer =

Song

Frauncis new Jigge, betweene Frauncis a Gentleman, and Richard a Farmer is an English broadside ballad published by George Attowell in the early 17th-century, and is set to the tune of "Go from my Window Walshingham." The original copy of the ballad has, over the years, sustained surface damage and uneven inking, but is nevertheless available for view at the Pepys Library of Magdalene College, Cambridge. Online facsimiles of the ballad, as well as audio recordings sung to the original tune, are available online.

== Synopsis ==
The ballad opens with an English nobleman named Frauncis attempting to woo Besse, Richard's wife. Frauncis promises to bestow upon Besse much wealth if she will let him have his way with her. When Besse acquiesces to do so that night, Frauncis departs and Richard enters. Besse and Richard hatch a bed trick plot with Frauncis' wife. When the ruse succeeds, Frauncis is shamed, exclaiming that he will love his own wife anew and desist from making further advances on Besse. This ballad thus explores issues of early modern infidelity and marriage politics.
