= Bed trick =

Plot device involving substituting one partner in bed with a third person

The bed trick is a plot device in traditional literature and folklore; it involves a substitution of one partner in the sex act with a third person (in the words of Wendy Doniger, "going to bed with someone whom you mistake for someone else"). In the standard and most common form of the bed trick, a man goes to a sexual assignation with a certain woman, and without his knowledge that woman's place is taken by a substitute.

== In traditional literature ==
Instances of the bed trick exist in the traditional literatures of many human cultures. It can be found in the Old Testament: in Genesis Chapter 29 Laban substitutes Leah for Rachel on Jacob's wedding night, as Jacob discovers the following morning. Other examples range throughout the Western canon (several occur in Arthurian romance, as well as in Chaucer's "The Reeve's Tale") and can be paralleled by instances in non-Western cultures (such as that of Indra and Ahalya in the ancient Indian epic Ramayana).

Male versions of the bed trick are rarer but not unprecedented; a classical instance occurs when Zeus disguises himself as Amphitryon to impregnate Alcmene with the future Hercules. Similarly, in Arthurian legend, Uther Pendragon takes the place of Gorlois to impregnate Igraine with the future King Arthur.

== Renaissance ==
For modern readers and audiences, the bed trick is most immediately and most closely associated with English Renaissance drama, primarily due to the uses of the bed trick by Shakespeare in his two dark comedies, All's Well That Ends Well and Measure for Measure. In All's Well That Ends Well, Bertram thinks he is going to have sex with Diana, the woman he is trying to seduce; Helena, the protagonist, takes Diana's place in the darkened bedchamber, and so consummates their arranged marriage. In this case, the bed trick derives from Shakespeare's non-dramatic plot source, the ninth story of the third day in The Decameron by Boccaccio (which Shakespeare may have accessed through an English-language intermediary, the version in William Painter's Palace of Pleasure). In Measure for Measure, Angelo expects to have sex with Isabella, the heroine; but the Duke substitutes Mariana, the woman Angelo had engaged to marry but abandoned. In this case the bed trick was not present in Shakespeare's sources, but was added to the plot by the poet.

(Related plot elements can be found in two other Shakespearean plays. In the final scene of Much Ado About Nothing, the bride at Claudio's wedding turns out to be Hero instead of her cousin, as expected; and in The Two Noble Kinsmen, the Wooer pretends to be Palamon to sleep with and marry the Jailer's Daughter.)

The two uses of the bed trick by Shakespeare are the most famous in the drama of his era; they were emulated by more than forty other uses, however, and virtually every major successor of Shakespeare down to the closing of the theatres in 1642 employed the plot element at least once. The use of the bed trick in Middleton and Rowley's The Changeling, in which Diaphanta takes Beatrice-Joanna's place on the latter's wedding night, is probably the most famous instance outside of Shakespeare. Rowley also provides a gender-reversed instance of the bed trick in his All's Lost by Lust, in which it is the male rather than the female partner in the sexual pair who is substituted.

Multiple uses of the bed trick occur in the works of Thomas Middleton, John Marston, John Fletcher, James Shirley, Richard Brome, and Thomas Heywood. Shakespeare employs the bed trick to yield plot resolutions that largely conform to traditional morality, as do some of his contemporaries; in the comic subplot to The Insatiate Countess (c. 1610), Marston constructs a double bed trick in which two would-be adulterers sleep with their own wives. Shakespeare's successors, however, tend to use the trick in more sensational and salacious ways. In Rowley's play cited above, it leads to the mistaken murder of the substituted man. Middleton's Hengist, King of Kent features an extreme version of the bed trick, in which a woman is kidnapped and raped in darkness, by a man she doesn't realise is her own husband.

== Post-Renaissance ==
After theatres re-opened with the start of the Restoration era, the bed trick made sporadic appearances in plays by Elkanah Settle and Aphra Behn, and perhaps reached its culmination in Sir Francis Fane's Love in the Dark (1675); but in time it passed out of fashion in drama.

Modern critics, readers, and audience members tend to find the bed trick highly artificial and lacking in credibility (though scholar Marliss Desens cites one alleged real-life instance of its employment in Shakespeare's era). In contemporary legal systems the bed trick may be considered a form of rape by deception.

== Some other bed-trick plays ==
- Blurt, Master Constable
- The English Moor
- The Family of Love
- A Game at Chess
- The Gamester
- Grim the Collier of Croydon
- The Lady of Pleasure
- Love's Last Shift
- The Marriage of Figaro
- A Mad Couple Well-Match'd
- The Novella
- The Parliament of Love
- The Queen of Corinth
- The Wedding
- The Widow's Tears
- The Witch
- The Wonder of Women
- True Lies

== In other media ==
In Richard Strauss's 1932 opera Arabella, Zdenka/Zdenko, the daughter consigned to live as a boy because of family finances, contrives to pretend she is her sister Arabella to sleep with Matteo, with whom she is secretly in love.

The bed trick can be seen in Eliza Haywood's novel Love in Excess.

The bed trick is used in Roald Dahl's story The Great Switcheroo.

A variation of the bed trick can also be seen in the movie Revenge of the Nerds.

The Family Guy episode "Peter-assment" features a farcical and unwieldy variation, with Peter hiding Quagmire and Mort under his clothes to have sex with his boss Angela.

The bed trick is also used twice in the film The Rocky Horror Picture Show.
