= The Sparagus Garden =

1635 play written by Richard Brome

The Sparagus Garden is a Caroline era stage play, a comedy by Richard Brome. It was the greatest success of Brome's career, and one of the major theatrical hits of its period.

== Performance and publication ==
The Sparagus Garden was acted by the King's Revels Men at the Salisbury Court Theatre in 1635. It was enormously popular, and reportedly earned the company £1000, a tremendous sum for a play in the 1630s. (The sheer magnitude of its success may have contributed to Brome's legal difficulties in the years immediately following: in attempting to reap greater profits from his future work, Brome entangled himself in contract disputes and lawsuits with two theatre organisations, those of Richard Heton at the Salisbury Court and Christopher Beeston at the Cockpit Theatre.)

The play was revived early in the Restoration era, and was acted at the theatre at Lincoln's Inn Fields in the 1662–65 interval. It was first published in 1640, in a quarto printed by John Okes for the bookseller Francis Constable. In that volume, Brome dedicated the play to William Cavendish, Duke of Newcastle, one of the major literary patrons of his generation.

== Topical matters ==
Brome's plays are rich with allusions to contemporary conditions that offer miniature snapshots of London life at the time. The Sparagus Garden contains references to the sedan chairs that were then coming into fashion, and to dromedary rides across the frozen River Thames in winter. (During the Little Ice Age, the Thames repeatedly froze over, so extremely that "frost fairs" were held on the surface of the ice. The river was frozen over in the winter of 1634–35.)

Consistent with this topicality, Brome's play referred to an actual London asparagus garden; it was located on 2 acres (8,100 m^{2}) in Lambeth Marsh near Waterloo – a narrow piece of land running up from the River Thames, roughly opposite the Whitehall Stairs. It was a fashionable destination in its day, "an expensive pleasure ground on the south bank of the river, where asparagus and fresh strawberries were served, with sugar and wine...." The Garden acquired a reputation as a place of romantic assignation. It was still in operation in the 1660s; Samuel Pepys visited in April 1668, hoping to meet Elizabeth Knepp, the actress who had once been his wife's maid. (He was disappointed.)

The Sparagus Garden belongs to a group of plays that reflect a trend of the 1630s, in which playwrights exploited "place realism," linking their dramas to actual locations and institutions of their contemporary world. James Shirley's Hyde Park (1632) is an obvious example, as are Shackerley Marmion's Holland's Leaguer (1631) and Thomas Nabbes's Covent Garden (1633) and Tottenham Court (1634). Several of Brome's other plays, like The Weeding of Covent Garden (c. 1632–33) and The New Academy (1636), fall into this category. Ben Jonson's Bartholomew Fair (1614) stood as a precedent, especially pertinent to Brome, Jonson's self-style acolyte – though other precedents, like The Fair Maid of the Exchange (c. 1602) and Lording Barry's Ram Alley (c. 1607), can also be noted. (Bartholomew Fair, however, was first printed in 1631, an event that may have stimulated the trend of the 1630s.) And later plays, like William Wycherley's Love in a Wood (1671) and Thomas Shadwell's Epsom Wells (1672) and Bury Fair (1689) among other examples, continued the subgenre of "topographical comedy".

== Synopsis ==
Brome's play involves the sexual themes, generational conflicts, and the confidence tricks that are typical of his drama. Touchwood and Striker are two London neighbours, both justices of the peace; they maintain a vigorous and long-running quarrel. Their hostility is counterpointed by the affection of their heirs: Touchwood's son Sam and Striker's granddaughter Annabelle are in love. When Touchwood discovers this fact, he forbids their marriage, and insists that Sam inflict some serious injury on the Striker family to stay in his father's good graces (and his will). Sam is fortunate to have two clever friends, Gilbert Goldwire and Walter Chamlet, who work up a plot to resolve Sam's predicament. Sam tells his father that he has impregnated Annabelle; and Touchwood, delighted at the scandal impending over the Striker household, sends his son abroad – or so he thinks; in fact Sam remains in London to carry out his plans.

Annabelle's mother was Striker's daughter, now deceased; her father is Sir Hugh Moneylack, a down-and-out gentleman who survives by shady means. Striker is hostile to his son-in-law, and keeps Annabelle, his granddaughter and heir, from seeing her father. (The play often refers to Annabelle as Striker's niece, reflecting the common usage of "niece" to mean "granddaughter" in the period.) Sir Hugh functions as what is called a "gather-guest" for the Sparagus Garden, bringing in profitable trade to the facility. (Moneylack presents asparagus as an aphrodisiac, claiming that "Of all the plants, herbs, roots, or fruits that grow, it is the most provocative, operative, and effective" for that purpose. In actuality, the medical opinion of Brome's day regarded the vegetable as a mild diuretic.) The play shows that the Garden makes its money through private dining rooms made available to its customers – with a clear sexual innuendo in the arrangement: when Sam, Wat, and Gilbert show up at the Garden without female companionship, they are refused a private dining room.

Sir Hugh Moneylack also is part of a group of charlatans; with his confederates Springe and Brittleware, he targets a naive countryman named Tim Hoyden who longs to be made a gentleman. The tricksters take every advantage of the man, physically abusing him with "bleeding" (bloodletting), "purging" (vomiting and enemas), and a starvation diet, and cheating him of £400 as they pretend to teach him the ways of fashionable society. Tim's brother Tom Hoyden comes to London in search of Tim, and chases around attempting to rescue Tim from the charlatans' clutches. Tom and his servant Coulter are from "Zumerzetshire," and inject into the play the kind of dialect humour typical of Brome's drama (Yorkshire dialect in The Northern Lass, Lancashire dialect in The Late Lancashire Witches).

The charlatans have their own problems, though: Brittleware's wife Rebecca is distressed that she's been married for five years but does not yet have a child. She is vocal in blaming her husband for this, and makes husband Brittleware jump through hoops and pursue her around the town to punish him for his possessiveness and jealousy.

The young conspirators manipulate Walter's ridiculous uncle Sir Arthur Cautious, a confirmed bachelor, into an arranged betrothal with Annabelle. Striker, who believes in her disgrace, is so eager for the marriage that he makes generous provisions for her. When their wedding day arrives, however, Annabelle appears dressed in black and apparently pregnant. Sir Arthur is appalled, and offers £1000 to the man who will take the young woman off his hands. Sam suddenly steps forward, and Striker is so desperate that he accepts his enemy's son as his son-in-law.

Touchwood, too, is now ready to accept the match. Tom Hoyden has presented documents to the justice, to prove that foolish brother Tim is the long-lost son of Touchwood and Striker's late sister. Those two had had a relationship similar to that of Sam and Annabelle – but Striker had opposed their match, which instigated the thirty-year quarrel between them. Once both old men accept their heirs' marriage, Annabelle pulls a cushion out from under her dress, revealing her pregnancy fictitious and her virtue intact. (Brome's play shares this plot device with Thomas May's 1622 comedy The Heir.) Tim Hoyden is now the son of a gentleman, as he'd always wanted to be; the play's conflicts are resolved.
