= The Queen's Exchange =

Caroline era stage play by Richard Brome

The Queen's Exchange is a Caroline era stage play, a tragicomedy written by Richard Brome.

== Publication and performance ==
The Queen's Exchange was first published in 1657, in a quarto issued by the bookseller Henry Brome. (Henry Brome was reportedly no relation to the dramatist; he joined with Andrew Crooke to issue the Brome collection Five New Plays in 1659.) The play was reprinted in 1661 under the title The Royal Exchange.

The quarto's title page states that the play was acted by the King's Men at the Blackfriars Theatre. The date of that first production is uncertain; but Brome is known to have written for the King's Men in the earliest phase of his career, in the late 1620s and early 1630s. The play is often conjecturally dated to 1629–31. The play's most recent editor, Marian O'Connor, offers persuasive reasons for doubting the attribution to the King's Men, and for dating the play to around 1634.

== Genre ==
Brome was not a tragedian; of his sixteen extant plays, thirteen are contemporary comedies, usually set in London and assignable to the category of city comedy. Only three of Brome's plays are tragicomedies; in addition to The Queen's Exchange, they are The Queen and Concubine and The Lovesick Court. It can be argued that Brome lacked a natural gift for the tragicomic form – one critic referred to "Brome's three feeble tragicomedies." Two of his three works in the genre, The Queen's Exchange and The Queen and Concubine, share the plot element of the king betraying his queen with a social inferior.

== Influences ==
Brome is universally recognised as more derivative than original in his plays (as is true of Caroline drama generally). His comedies rely heavily on the precedents of Ben Jonson and the city comedy of Thomas Middleton, Thomas Dekker and others. In tragicomedy, his influences are different: "The Queen's Exchange is much more reminiscent of Shakespeare than any other of Brome's plays," with links to King Lear and Macbeth. The play also shows apparent or possible borrowings from works by Philip Massinger and John Ford; it has been described as a "virtual pastiche" of earlier works in the tragicomic form.

== Lesbianism ==
In Act II, scene i of The Queen's Exchange, the character Theodrick states that "I have known women oft marry one another." It is a surprising line in the context of the prevailing morality of the seventeenth century – though other Brome plays, notably A Mad Couple Well-Match'd and The Antipodes, contain similar allusions to lesbianism. Brome appears to have been more aware of the phenomenon, or more interested in it, than most playwrights of his era.

== Synopsis ==
The play is set in the early medieval period, when Britain was divided into a number of small kingdoms. The opening scene shows Bertha, queen of the West Saxons, with her council, discussing her impending marriage to Osrick, king of Northumbria. Her sycophantic courtiers are in favour of the match; but one old and highly principled nobleman, Segebert, opposes the arranged marriage. He fears that the local laws and customs of the Saxons will be supplanted by those of Northumbria. The imperious Bertha responds by banishing Segebert from her country.

The second scene shows Segebert at home with his children, as he prepares for exile. He has two sons, Anthynus and Offa, and a daughter, Mildred. Though Anthynus is the elder, Segebert has a partiality for Offa; and when he leaves for exile he assigns care of his estates to Offa. Anthynus wins his father's permission to accompany the old man into banishment. At the end of the scene, Offa says in an aside that "I cannot speak for laughing" over this outcome – indicating that he is not the figure of virtue he appears to be. (This subplot involving Segebert, Anthynus, and Offa resembles the Gloucester/Edgar/Edmund subplot in King Lear.)

Osrick is shown among his courtiers, discussing the impending marriage. His ambassador, Theodrick, has just returned from Bertha's court, where, in addition to promoting Osrick's match, he has been courting Mildred, Segebert's daughter. The king and his ambassador compare their miniature portraits of the two women; and Osrick is overwhelmed with a sudden infatuation for Mildred. His passion is so intense that it drives him into a mental state of melancholy and distraction.

Travelling in the forest as pilgrims, Segebert and Anthynus are attacked by a disguised Offa and three outlaws hired by him. Anthynus and Segebert defend themselves; Offa is disarmed of his sword and flees, and the outlaws are driven off – though one of the outlaws is severely wounded, and Segebert receives a head wound. Anthynus takes Segebert in search of aid. A passing hermit and his servant find the wounded outlaw, and care for him at the hermit's cave. Anthynus has to leave his father for a time to seek help; in a soliloquy, Segebert admits that he has recognised the abandoned sword as one that he once gave to Offa. The hermit and his servant find Segebert, and take him too into their care. Anthynus is beside himself when he cannot locate Segebert again; he swears not to eat or sleep until he finds his father.

The lovesick Osrick has taken to wandering the countryside around his court; and his courtiers are busy trying to keep track of him. After three days, Anthynus has also wandered into the area; weak from exhaustion, he has a vision in which he joins the line of West Saxon kings. He sleeps deeply, and two of the Northumbrian courtiers discover him, unconscious. The physical resemblance between Anthynus and Osrick is so strong that the courtiers mistake the former for the latter, and carry Anthynus back to court. Osrick enters a pretended seclusion, and absconds to meet Mildred – not realising that Anthynus has been mistaken for him.

Anthynus regains consciousness in Osrick's place; his assertions of his identity are taken as symptoms of his psychological malady. He decides to play along with the error, and is released from restraints – just in time for Bertha's arrival at the Northumbrian court. A dumbshow portrays the meeting of Anthynus and Bertha among their courtiers – and their quick marriage.

The two remaining outlaws come to Offa, assuring him of the deaths of Segebert and Anthynus and demanding payment; Offa rewards them by trapping them in a subterranean dungeon. He also makes ruthless sexual advances toward Mildred. To prevent her ravishment, Mildred's old nurse Edith tells them that Mildred is adopted, and so not really Offa's sister; Offa agrees to wait a week before taking Mildred's maidenhead, in the belief that she will marry him. When Osrick arrives to find Mildred, he is mistaken for Anthynus; Offa wants to kill him for his supposed parricide of Segebert, but Segebert's virtuous servants demand that Osrick/"Anthynus" be imprisoned for trial.

Act V contains one of the more remarkably bizarre scenes in English Renaissance drama. Dressed up as devils, three craftsmen, a carpenter, a mason, and a smith, break into Offa's castle. They are the men who built Offa's subterranean room, which they interpret as his "jewel house." During construction, they made "a privy way for themselves to come and take a share" of the supposed treasure. The carpenter is lowered into the room; when the others try to draw him back up, they retrieve one of the outlaws instead. The man is wasted and starving, but still alive. When the carpenter is pulled up, the second starving outlaw is clinging to him, and even biting at him. The Carpenter complains that this "cannibal" has come close to castrating him:

He has gnaw'd a piece of my flank out with's teeth;
And missed very narrowly certain members of more moment,
They'd have gone down glib with him....

The workmen rescue the outlaws and give them crusts of bread; they are surprised by Mildred and Edith, who are trying to escape from Offa's clutches. Offa himself enters, and the devil-disguised craftsmen bluff their way out with the outlaws and women. The shock of this encounter with "devils" and the "ghosts" of the outlaws deranges Offa's reason.

Osrick's trial for Anthynus's supposed murder of Segebert provides for the plot's resolution. Anthynus admits that he is not Osrick, and Osrick is recognised as himself. Offa is brought in, bound to a chair; in his distraction he freely confesses his crimes. Edith states that her tale about Mildred's adoption was a lie, told to forestall Offa's lust. The recovered Segebert and outlaw also arrive; the outlaws confess and are forgiven. Bertha is happy with Anthynus as her husband, so making him king of the West Saxons and fulfilling his vision. Osrick is free to marry Mildred.

== Critical responses ==
The play's treatment of the "pretended prince" theme has been singled out for attention. Brome's handling of the subject of mental illness, a recurring aspect of his drama, has also received comment.
