= The New Academy =

1636 play written by Richard Brome

The New Academy, or the New Exchange is a Caroline era stage play, a comedy written by Richard Brome. It was first printed in 1659.

== Performance and publication ==
The New Academy was premiered onstage in 1636. The play was entered into the Stationers' Register on 4 August 1640 by the bookseller Andrew Crooke, along with five other Brome plays. Yet the work did not see print until it was included in the 1659 Brome collection Five New Plays, issued by Crooke and Henry Brome (a bookseller who was not related to the dramatist). In the 1659 collection, each drama has its own title page; and three of the five, including The New Academy, are dated 1658 instead of 1659 on those pages. Some of the plays also have separate pagination; this may indicate that the plays were originally intended for individual publication – though scholarly opinion varies on this question.

== Background ==
The seventeenth century saw an explosion of new social institutions and organisations, as the late-Renaissance societies of Western Europe moved decisively away from Medieval social organisation toward modern forms. The first scientific and philosophical organisations were founded in many places, along with new educational institutions. France saw the founding of the Académie Française (1635) and the Académie des Inscriptions et Belles-Lettres (1663); In England, the formation of the Royal Society (1660), the earliest known Masonic lodges, and the earliest schools for girls were varying expressions of this same trend.

Simultaneously, many more modest and more transitory institutions were coming into (and passing out of) existence. Schools to teach manners and social customs for the nouveau riche of expanding economies were a phenomenon of the era. James Shirley's earliest extant play, Love Tricks, centres on this phenomenon; it was first published in 1631 under its subtitle, The School of Compliment. Other Caroline dramatists and non-dramatic writers also commented on the trend. Brome includes views of this phenomenon in his plays The Sparagus Garden and The Damoiselle.

The most direct historical model for Brome's Academy was probably Francis Kynaston's Museum Minervae, a school for training members of the gentry and aristocracy "in arms and arts." King Charles I granted Kynaston a patent for his academy in June 1635, and in 1636 Kynaston published the school's constitution, which compared his intended school with similar academies in Paris, Rome, and elsewhere. The Minervae was located on Bedford Street, just west of the new development at Covent Garden (which Brome had treated in his earlier play The Weeding of Covent Garden). Yet the bubonic plague epidemic of 1636–37 was fatal to Kynaston's enterprise, which was defunct by 1639.

Brome's play touches upon the nexus of social education with money, in associating his "new academy" with the "New Exchange," an actual business institution of the period. The New Exchange was a mall of shops built on the Strand in 1609, to complement and compete with the original Royal Exchange, founded by Sir Thomas Gresham in 1571. Brome does not exploit the New Exchange directly in his play; instead, he employs a more general concept of a "new exchange" of social and marital choices among the economically and socially mobile denizens of London.

== Place realism ==
The New Academy is one of a group of plays from the 1630s that show strong tendencies toward what critics have called "place realism," the exploitation of actual contemporaneous locations and institutions in their settings and plots. Such plays can be found scattered throughout the seventeenth century (to cite only the most pertinent historical period); yet a surprising number of them cluster in this single decade. Shirley's Hyde Park (1632) is an obvious example, as are Shackerley Marmion's Holland's Leaguer (1631) and Thomas Nabbes's Covent Garden (1633) and Tottenham Court (1634), among other plays of the time. The first publication of Ben Jonson's Bartholomew Fair in 1631 may have acted as a spur to this type of drama. Several of Brome's plays fall naturally into the same category – in addition to The New Academy, The Weeding of Covent Garden (c. 1632–33) and The Sparagus Garden (1635) are good examples of "topographical comedy."

== Synopsis ==
The play's plot centres on the complicated and disputacious family of a successful London merchant named Matchill. He has a sister, the widowed Lady Nestlecock, the doting mother of a simpleton son, Nehemiah Nestlecock; and a half-brother, the ne'er-do-well Strigood. Strigood has spent his way through his own patrimony; Matchill refuses financial help to the spendthrift. Strigood has an answer to this rejection: he has drawn Matchill's apprentice Cash into the fashionable gallants' world of gambling and drinking. To afford this style of life, Cash spends his master's money, some of which finds its way into Strigood's pockets.

Matchill is a widower – a contented one, since he describes his late wife as a shrew. He has two children, a son named Philip and a daughter called Joyce. Many years before, Matchill had sent his son to live in France, in the household of a fellow merchant named Lafoy; and in turn Matchill accepted Lafoy's daughter Gabriella into his home. Suddenly, a letter arrives telling Matchill that Philip has died. Matchill blames Lafoy for his son's loss, and responds by turning Gabriella out of his house. Joyce protests vigorously at this; when the irascible merchant tells his daughter that she can accept his decision or join her friend in the cold world, Joyce loyally accompanies Gabriella. Lady Nestlecock offers the young women sanctuary in her home, and Strigood offers to escort them there; the three leave for that destination...and then disappear. The corrupted Cash also absconds at the same time.

The jealous husband is a staple of English Renaissance drama, and appears in Brome plays as in those of other writers (as with Brittleware in Sparagus Garden). In this play, Brome reverses the stereotype, and creates a husband who goes to the opposite extreme. Rafe Camelion is a "uxorious citizen" who dismisses every temptation to jealousy and possessiveness; his wife Hannah complains that he leaves her exposed to the gossip of women and the solicitations of men. One such man is the libertine Valentine Askal, who plans on the seduction of Hannah Camelion. (When people address him as "Mr. Askal," it sounds like "Master Rascal.") His friend and companion Erasmus is, in contrast, the play's voice of reason and responsibility. Hannah seems to encourage Valentine's intention: she gives him money, ten and twenty pounds at a time.

Lady Nestlecock is being courted by Sir Swithin Whimlby, an elderly knight who frequently weeps over the loss of his first wife. The plan is that the knight will marry the lady and that her son Nehemiah will marry the knight's niece, Mistress Blythe Tripshort. Blythe, however, is the one sensible person here, and she loathes the thought of marrying Nehemiah, who still plays with children's toys. Matchill soon confronts his sister and her companions with the news that he has married his meek and rather brow-beaten serving-woman Rachel. The now-merry Matchill makes Sir Swithin laugh instead of weep; the old knight's merriment increases when the now-married Rachel reveals herself to be a vociferous and demanding wife, as shrewish as her predecessor. True to his name, Matchill has "match'd ill."

Meanwhile, Strigood, calling himself Lightfoot and presenting Joyce and Gabriella as his daughters, has started a school to teach "music, dancing, fashion, compliment" and the French language to London gentry. Cash is his henchman is this scheme, and the two girls are reluctant participants. News of the school, and its fair young women, spreads quickly, and the play's other characters come in groups to investigate its offerings. Papillion and Galliard, two young men freshly arrived from France, are particularly attracted to the young women; Strigood/Lightfoot is not above trying to sell the girls' virginities to the young men, though both the females and males resist this (the women, more diligently than the men). The four young people share strong mutual attractions, so that each female has trouble choosing between the males, and vice versa. The problem is that they are all most strongly attracted to their siblings – for Papillion and Galliard are actually Philip and Francis, the sons of Matchill and Lafoy.

The school demonstrates its services to its visitors, with songs and dances performed onstage. Its effects are not wholly fraudulent: under its influence, Lady Nestlecock and Rachel abandon their previous nastiness and learn to behave cordially to each other. Hannah Camelion uses Valentine to provoke her husband, finally, to jealousy: when Rafe Camelion learns that she's given the young man £50, his equanimity evaporates. Then Hannah reveals to both men that, far from being a potential target of seduction, she is Valentine's stepsister, and the money she dispenses to him is financial support from his stepfather.

Lafoy comes to London, and Matchill reproaches him for the loss of his son. Together they track down their daughters, so that all the characters now assemble at the school. Nehemiah is distressed to learn that he has lost Blythe Tripshort for good: she and Valentine's friend Erasmus have met, liked, and married without delay. The two fathers are shocked to find their sons and daughters; the quartet claim that they too have married, in what appears to be a double case of incest. When it turns out that the marriages have not actually occurred, both fathers are relieved enough to acquiesce to the alternative arrangement: a "new exchange" in which Philip/Papillion marries Gabriella, and Francis/Galliard marries Joyce. Other differences are compounded, faults forgiven, and financial allowances are bestowed. Strigood admits that he wrote the letter to Matchill that falsely claimed Philip's death, as a part of his manipulative schemes.
