= Richard Brome =

English dramatist (c. 1590–1652)

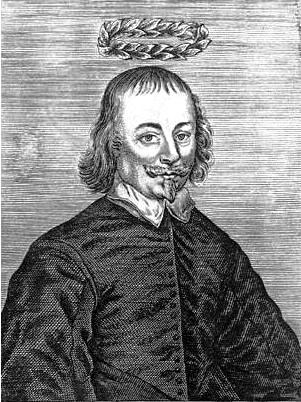
- Engraving by T. Cross from Five New Playes (1653)
- Born: c. 1590
- Died: 24 September 1652 (aged c. 60); London
- Occupation: dramatist

Richard Brome /bruːm/; (c. 1590? – 24 September 1652) was an English dramatist of the Caroline era.

== Life ==
Virtually nothing is known about Brome's private life. Repeated allusions in contemporary works, like Ben Jonson's Bartholomew Fair, indicate that Brome started out as a servant of Jonson, in some capacity. Scholars have interpreted the allusions to mean that Brome may have begun as a menial servant but later became a sort of secretary and general assistant to the older playwright. A single brief mention of his family's need seems to show that he had a wife and children and struggled to support them.

He may have had some experience as a professional actor: a 1628 warrant lists him as a member of the Queen of Bohemia's Men. Yet he had already started writing for the stage by this date. An early collaboration, A Fault in Friendship (now lost) was licensed in 1623 for Prince Charles's Men; a 1629 solo Brome effort, The Lovesick Maid (also lost), was a success for the King's Men. The Northern Lass (1632) was another success, and made Brome's reputation.

Due to the survival of various legal documents, much more is known about Brome's professional activities than his personal life. Once established as a dramatist, Brome wrote for all the major acting companies and theaters of his era – for the Blackfriars Theatre; for the Red Bull Theatre; and from 1635 onward, for the King's Revels Company and Queen Henrietta's Men at the Salisbury Court Theatre. Brome's Sparagus Garden was a huge success at the Salisbury Court in 1635, earning over £1000. As a result, Brome signed a three-year contract with Richard Heton, manager of the Salisbury Court, to write three plays annually at a salary of 15 shillings per week plus one day's profit per play. Brome, however, was unable to produce dramas at the promised pace; and the stipulated payments to Brome were not kept up. In need of money, Brome resorted to Christopher Beeston, actor, impresario, and owner of the Cockpit Theatre (also known as the Phoenix) as well as the Red Bull. In August 1635 Beeston loaned Brome £6, and in return Brome committed to write Beeston a play. Heton tried to lure Brome back with a £10 payment for a new play; but they fell behind in his payments again, and Brome turned again to Beeston. Heton appealed to Sir Henry Herbert, Master of the Revels, to settle the dispute; Herbert decreed that Brome be paid six shillings a week and £5 for each new play, the payments to continue even when the theaters were closed.

The dispute was complicated by the fact that the theatres endured one of their longest enforced closings due to plague in this period; they were closed almost continuously from 10 May 1636 to 2 October 1637. Beeston ejected Queen Henrietta's Men from the Cockpit Theatre in 1636, forcing that company to split up for a time. The King's Revels Men, formerly at the Salisbury Court, dissolved permanently in the crisis of the closure; but the Queen's company made a resurgence, with the help of Sir Henry Herbert, who had a financial stake in the Salisbury Court Theatre. When the plague diminished enough for performances to resume in October 1637, the re-organized Queen Henrietta's Men commenced the new season at the Salisbury Court with, it is thought, Brome's The English Moor.

When Brome's 1635 contract with Heton ended in 1638, new disputes arose among Brome, Beeston, and Heton; a bill of complaint was filed against Brome, though the outcome of the case is unknown.

It seems that once the Puritans closed the theaters in 1642, Brome struggled seriously. He may have authored an entertainment, Juno in Arcadia, which John P. Cutts has argued was performed for Queen Henrietta Maria's arrival at Oxford in 1643. (Note: Steggle reports Cutts's suggestion, but doubts that the entertainment is associated with Oxford. Juno in Arcadia is also known by several alternative titles: Juno's Pastoral, Time's Distractions, Time's Triumphs, Sight and Search, and The Bonds of Peace.) He wrote commendatory verses for the Beaumont and Fletcher First Folio (1647). In 1649–50 he edited a volume of elegies, titled Lachrymae Musarum, on the death of Henry, Lord Hastings. (Note: The young Lord Hastings, son and heir to Ferdinando Hastings, 6th Earl of Huntingdon and Lucy Hastings, his Countess, died on 24 June 1649. Lachrymae Musarum, "Tears of the Muses," was published by stationer John Holden, in two impressions: the first of 1649 held 27 poems, by Andrew Marvell, Robert Herrick, Sir Aston Cockayne, Charles Cotton and others, and the second of 1650 contained 36, including one by John Dryden.) In 1652, in a dedication to Thomas Stanley for a quarto edition of his A Jovial Crew, Brome described himself as "poor and proud."

Brome died at Charterhouse Hospital, London, on 24 September 1652. Prior to this, he signed for quarterly pension payments for washing, 'beverage' and gown money from 1651 to 1652, at which point his entry in the pension book is superscribed 'mort'; a record of payment for his burial follows. (Note: Brome's pension signature was cross-checked with his signature on the manuscript of "The English Moor" at Lichfield Cathedral Library.)

== Canon ==
The plays Brome wrote were certainly, and strongly, influenced by Jonsonian comedy (Brome was not a tragedian). He was, admittedly and unambiguously, one of the Sons of Ben. The canon of his extant plays includes:

- The City Wit, c. 1629?, revived 1637, printed 1653
- The Northern Lass, performed 1629, printed 1632
- The Queen's Exchange, c. 1629–30?, printed 1657
- The Novella, performed 1632, printed 1653
- The Weeding of Covent Garden, performed 1633?, printed 1659
- The Sparagus Garden, performed 1635, printed 1640
- The Damoiselle or the New Ordinary, c. 1638?; printed 1653
- The English Moor, or The Mock Marriage, performed 1637, printed 1659
- The Antipodes, performed 1638, printed 1640
- A Mad Couple Well-Match'd, performed 1639?, printed 1653
- The Lovesick Court, or The Ambitious Politic, registered 1640, printed 1659
- The Court Beggar, ?1640, printed 1653
- The New Academy, or The New Exchange, registered 1640, printed 1659
- The Queen and Concubine, c. 1635–39?, printed 1659
- A Jovial Crew, or the Merry Beggars, performed ?1641, printed 1652.

The English Moor also survives in a manuscript version.

Brome collaborated with Thomas Heywood in The Late Lancashire Witches, which was acted by the King's Men and printed in 1634. The play was based on contemporary events of 1633–34.

Brome plays that have not survived include: The Lovesick Maid (1629); Wit in a Madness (?1637); The Jewish Gentleman (registered 1640); A Fault in Friendship (1623), perhaps with Jonson and another collaborator; two more collaborations with Heywood, The Life and Death of Sir Martin Skink (c. 1634) and The Apprentice's Prize (c. 1633–41); and Christianetta, or Marriage and Hanging Go by Destiny (registered 1640), possibly a collaboration with George Chapman. (Note: On all Brome's lost plays, see "Brome, Richard", Lost Plays Database, ed. Roslyn L. Knutson and David McInnis, http://www.lostplays.org/index.php/Brome,_Richard)

Alfred Harbage has argued that two of John Dryden's plays, The Wild Gallant (1663) and The Mistaken Husband (1674), are adaptations of otherwise-lost plays by Brome, based on the plays' internal evidence of plot and style.

In an active playwriting career of not quite fifteen years, 1629 to 1642, Brome produced about two plays a year. Judging by the overall productivity of dramatists in English Renaissance drama, this appears to have been the pragmatic long-term maximum for a playwright who worked primarily as a solo artist (which in turn illustrates the impracticality of Brome's attempt to produce three plays a year). (Note: Some playwrights – Thomas Heywood and Thomas Dekker are good examples – produced plays at greater rates, but only through frequent and varied collaboration.)

== Editions ==
Two important collections of Brome's works appeared in 1653 and 1659 – both, confusingly, titled Five New Plays. The 1653 edition, published by Humphrey Moseley, Richard Marriot, and Thomas Dring, contains A Mad Couple Well-Match'd, The Novella, The Court Beggar, The City Wit, and The Demoiselle. It features an Epistle to the Readers by Alexander Brome, thought to be no relation to the playwright. The 1659 volume, published by Andrew Crooke and Henry Brome (again, no relation), contains The English Moor, The Lovesick Court, The Weeding of Covent Garden, The New Academy, and The Queen and Concubine. (Note: Plays in such 17th-century collections were often meant to be published separately as well as together; each play had its own title page, and the dates on the title pages sometimes differed. In the 1659 volume, three plays are individually dated 1658 instead of 1659: The Lovesick Court, The Weeding of Covent Garden, and The New Academy.)

The 1653 edition also featured a portrait with a poem by Alexander Brome written in imitation of Jonson's poem on Shakespeare's First Folio portrait:

Reader lo heere thou will two faces finde,
One of the body, t’other of the Minde;
This by the Graver go, that with much strife
Wee thinke Brome dead, hee’s drawne so to the life
That by’s owne pen’s so ingeinoisly
That who read’s it must thinke hee ne’er shall dy

A∙ B∙

== Influence ==
When the theaters reopened during the Restoration, a handful of Brome's plays were performed and republished; the most successful was A Jovial Crew, which was acted widely and printed in 1661, 1684, and 1708. It was adapted into an opera in 1731. Other Brome plays reappeared in adapted forms. One example: The Debauchee by Aphra Behn (printed 1677) is a rewrite of Brome's A Mad Couple Well-Match'd, down to the characters' names.
