= The Antipodes =

Play written by Richard Brome

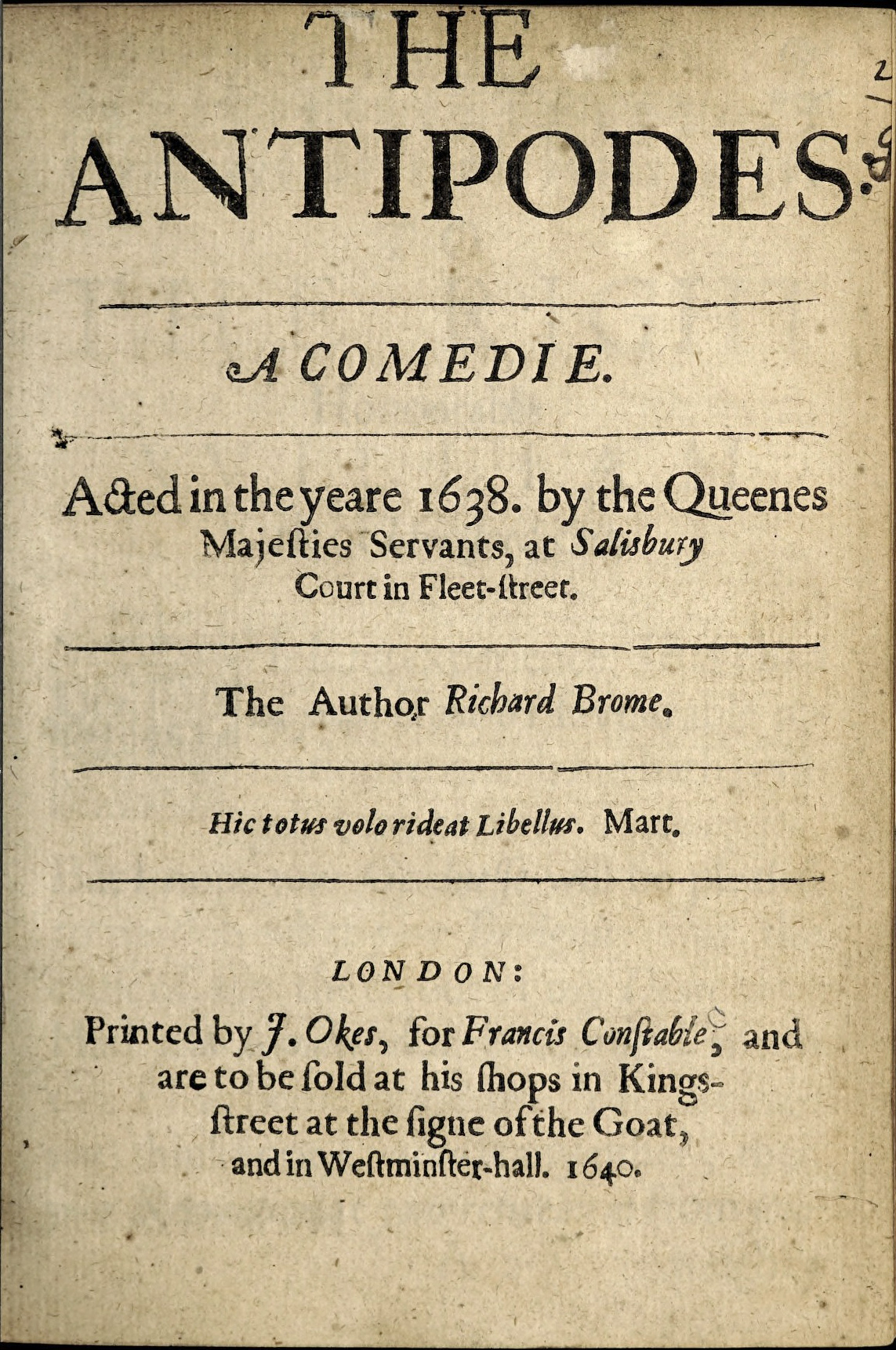
Title page of the first quarto of The Antipodes, 1640

The Antipodes is a Caroline era stage play, a comedy written by Richard Brome c. 1636. Many critics have ranked The Antipodes as "his best play...Brome's masterpiece," and one of the best Caroline comedies – "gay, imaginative, and spirited...;" "the most sophisticated and ingenious of Brome's satires." Brome's play is "a funhouse mirror" in which the audience members could "view the nature of their society."

== Date, performance, and publication ==
The Antipodes was entered into the Stationers' Register on 19 March 1640 and published later that year in a quarto printed by John Okes, the son and successor of printer Nicholas Okes, for the bookseller Francis Constable. The title page states that the play was acted in 1638 by Queen Henrietta's Men at the Salisbury Court Theatre, the regular troupe and venue for Brome's dramas from 1637 on. In a note addressed to the Courteous Reader at the end of the printed text, however, Brome writes that the play was originally intended for William Beeston's company at the Cockpit Theatre. The London theatres were closed from May 1636 to October 1637 due to a bubonic plague epidemic, and during that time Brome was involved in a contentious dispute with the Salisbury Court company, which because of the closure of the theatres had ceased to pay him his usual weekly salary. Legal documents from 1640 record that Brome agreed to write a play for Beeston in return for a loan in August of 1636, although he was subsequently released from that agreement and returned to Salisbury Court.

In the first edition, Brome dedicated the play to his patron, William Seymour, 2nd Duke of Somerset. At around the same time, Brome sent a manuscript of his recent play The English Moor to the Duke, likewise dedicated to Somerset.

Like others of Brome's plays, The Antipodes was revived during the Restoration era; Samuel Pepys saw it performed on 26 August 1661.

== Cast list ==
In 2012, Dr. Joshua McEvilla discovered a cast list of a 1638 staging of The Antipodes as performed by Queen Henrietta's Men at the Salisbury Court theatre. The list appears as handwritten marginalia in a copy of the 1640 edition previously owned by Dr. Hugh Selbourne. The copy was put up for auction by David Selbourne at Bonhams (25 March 2015), where it was sold to an anonymous buyer for £25,000.

Blaze, an Herauld Painter. Sumner Joylesse, an old Country Gentleman. Perkins
Hughball, a Doctor of Physicke. Wintersall
Barbara, Wife to Blaze. Ambrose
Martha, Wife to Perigrine. Chamberlain
Letoy, a Phantasticke Lord. Shirlocke
Quaylpipe, his Curate. Turner
Perigrine, sonne to Joylesse. May
Diana, wife to Joylesse. Watt
By-play, a conceited servant to Letoy. Turner
Trulocke, a close friend to Letoy. Yong

Followers of the Lord Letoyes, who are Actors in the By-play.
Read
Grevill
Cartwright h [sic]

== Sources ==
For the play's exotica, Brome relied first of all on the classic book The Travels of Sir John Mandeville; Mandeville himself is mentioned more than once in the play. Brome may have pulled hints and suggestions from other travel accounts, since the play refers to the famous English explorers of the day, Sir Francis Drake, Martin Frobisher, Sir Richard Hawkins, and Sir Thomas Cavendish. Many earlier writers stressed the sheer strangeness of far lands; Brome's self-styled "master," Ben Jonson, did so in a notable instance in his 1620 masque News from the New World Discovered in the Moon, with children who are part bird and coaches that are blown by the wind – and some of Jonson's wonders date back as far as the Vera Historia of Lucian. Strikingly, though, the idea of the Antipodes as a "topsy-turvy" place, where familiar relationships are directly reversed, seems to have been original with Brome; no clear precedents for it have been identified.

== Style ==
No critic has ever claimed that Brome was a great dramatic poet or a truly distinctive literary stylist; his verse and prose are generally nothing more than functional, and certainly lack the vivid eloquence of Shakespeare and the intellectual knottiness of his idol Jonson. In The Antipodes, however, the richness of Brome's material appears to inspire him to an imaginative quality that he rarely achieves elsewhere – as in this passage from Act I scene vi, on Sir John Mandeville and the talking trees of the Antipodes:

But he had reach'd

To this place here – yes here – this wilderness,
And seen the trees of the Sun and Moon, that speak,
And told King Alexander of his death; he then
Had left a passage ope for travellers,
That now is kept and guarded by wild beasts,
Dragons, and serpents, elephants white and blue
Unicorns, and lions of many colours,
And monsters more as numberless as nameless.

== Synopsis ==
The play's plot is complex and intricate, even by the standards of Brome. The opening scene shows the herald painter Anthony Blaze welcoming Master Joyless to London from the country. Joyless is oppressed by a set of personal problems. He is an older man, a former widower who has married a second wife, a seventeen-year-old woman named Diana – toward whom he is deeply possessive and jealous, fearing her potential infidelity. His son Peregrine has from his youth been obsessed with the literature of travel and voyaging, an obsession that is now so strong that it dominates his life, even to the point of preventing him from consummating his three-year-old marriage to his wife Martha – a circumstance that has left her profoundly unhappy, and almost as psychologically disturbed as her husband.

Blaze has a potential solution for all of the Joyless family's problems, in the treatments of a physician called Doctor Hughball, and the sponsorship of a mysterious nobleman named Letoy. Hughball had treated many disturbed Londoners successfully – even curing Blaze himself of his own suspicions of his wife's fidelity. His wife, Barbara Blaze, becomes an active participant in the eventual cure of the Joylesses, helping to manage Martha Joyless in particular.

Letoy is a wealthy aristocrat who pursues an odd lifestyle: he dresses plainly, yet furnishes his servants in rich clothes – the opposite of what is standard for noblemen of Brome's era. He also keeps a troupe of players, who he and the Doctor employ in their treatment of psychologically distressed individuals. The Doctor administers a powerful sleeping potion to Peregrine Joyless, and together with Master Joyless and his wife Diana they go to Letoy's country estate. There, Peregrine is told upon waking that he has travelled to the Antipodes, the country directly opposite England on the other side of the globe. Letoy's players involve Peregrine in a pageant of life in "Anti-London," as a means of curing his obsession. In the process, Joyless and his wife are treated as well, unwittingly to them.

Most of the play's middle and later portions are taken up by a play within a play, in which the Doctor, Blaze, and the actors, all under Letoy's direction, fool Peregrine into believing that he is actually in the Antipodes. The play goes anything but smoothly, as Martha attempts to interrupt, as Joyless and Diana comment caustically from the vantage point of their own unhappy marriage, and as Peregrine turns to whole enterprise his own way; the actors have to improvise and extemporize, and sometimes lose their way. But Letoy manages to direct the whole show toward the outcome he envisions.

In the metatheatre of the play within the play, Brome presents the society of "Anti-London" as a distorted mirror-image of English society of his day. (Brome carefully specifies that the Antipodean kingdom is like England in political structure and religion, thereby avoiding the two fatal subjects for a Caroline dramatist; his Antipodeans only reverse English "manners.") In Brome's Anti-London, lawyers are poor and shabbily dressed, while poets are rich and gaudy; a lawyer refuses all fees, until a female client beats him into accepting her money. A gallant begs from a beggar, so that he can buy his grandmother ballads and "Love-pamphlets," and "Hobby-horses and rattles for my grandfather." A maiden tries to pick up a gallant in the street, and when he refuses her she kicks him. Old men are sent to school by their adult children, and play hooky when they can. Servants rule their masters. Gentlemen talk and behave as crudely as the lowest of common laborers, while watermen and carmen comport themselves with grace and gentility.

The play goes somewhat awry when Peregrine wanders into the players' "tiring house" and finds their properties. Thinking he's in "some enchanted castle," he slaughters their stage "Monsters, giants, furies, beasts, and bugbears,"

Kills monster after monster; takes the puppets
Prisoners, knocks down the cyclops, tumbles all
Our jigambobs and trinkets to the wall.

By right of conquest, Peregrine crowns himself king of the Antipodes, with the players' pasteboard crown and sword of lath. Letoy, however, turns this unforeseen event to his advantage: he has Byplay, the leader of the actors, set the new king the task of reforming his kingdom.

Then, the topsy-turvy aspects of the Antipodes become less humorous and more threatening. A statesman entertains several "projectors," who present him with wild speculative projects – like increasing wool production by flaying horses alive and affixing sheepskins to them. The Statesman accepts all their follies. Antipodean justice punishes the victims of disasters like fires and shipwrecks, with "Imprisonment, banishment, and sometimes death," to teach them to be more careful next time; and it rewards thieves, bawds, and even "The captain of the cut-purses" when they are old and can no longer practice their crimes. The shocked and chastened king Peregrine determines to reform and rectify his kingdom.

Peregrine is presented with his wife Martha, dressed as his queen; he is told that she is the daughter of the last king of the Antipodes, and he must mate with her to secure his crown. Under the guidance of Doctor Hughball and Barbara Blaze, the couple retire to bed and consummate their marriage. Afterwards, Peregrine is like a man come out of a dream; his sanity and mental balance are returning.

Letoy almost drives Joyless to desperation, by making the old man believe that he, Letoy, is trying to seduce Joyless's wife Diana. Instead, Joyless witnesses Diana reject the nobleman's advances. Letoy informs both of them that he is Diana's true father. Years before, he had put aside his infant daughter to be raised by his client Truelock. In his younger years, Letoy himself had suffered from the curse of irrational jealousy, and had suspected that his daughter was another man's child. Only a death-bed assurance from his wife convinced Letoy that he had been wrong. Having recovered from his own irrationality, he turned to helping others do the same.

The play concludes in a masque: Discord ushers in the personifications of Folly, Jealousy, Melancholy, and Madness, to "most untunable" music. They, however, are driven out by Harmony, who leads in Mercury, Cupid, Bacchus, and Apollo, who bring wit, love, wine, and health.

== Sexuality ==
The subject of sex is central to the play's concerns. At least part of Joyless's problem with his wife is that he is no longer capable of satisfying her sexually; he fears that his wife will seek out another man for "some sport," since he "can make her none." Doctor Hughball asserts that in the Antipodes "the maids do woo / The bachelors," and that "The wives lie uppermost" – which Diana Joyless calls "a trim / Upside-down Antipodean trick indeed."

Martha Joyless is a child bride, a "poor piece of innocence" who has been kept ignorant of sexuality; she longs desperately for a baby, but doesn't quite know how to get one. She weeps as she complains of her husband Peregrine that

He ne'er put child not any thing towards it yet
To me to making; for I am past a child
To think they may be found in parsley beds,
Strawberry banks or rosemary bushes, though
I must confess I have sought and search'd such places
Because I would fain have had one.

Barbara Blaze calls Martha's enforced married chastity "monstrous." Martha asks Barbara "How came you by your babies?" and wants to be shown the mechanics of sex. Martha says that "A wanton maid" once kissed and fondled her – a franker indication of lesbian activity than plays of English Renaissance theatre usually provide. [See The Queen's Exchange and A Mad Couple Well-Match'd for other Brome allusions to lesbianism.]

Before he consummates his marriage, Peregrine talks about the Gadlibriens, a people mentioned in Mandeville who have an odd sexual practice: a bridegroom always hires "Another man to couple with his bride, / To clear the dangerous passage of a maidenhead." This suggests an inhibition and fear of sexuality that goes deeper than anything derived from Peregrine's obsession with travel.

At the end of the play, Brome includes Cupid and love as an essential part of his recipe for social sanity.

== Theatrics ==
In staging his play within a play, Letoy acts like a theatre director; he criticizes the mannerisms of the players and guides them toward a naturalistic style of acting. Brome doesn't have Letoy insist upon slavish adherence to the author's text; quite the opposite, he stresses the players' talent for improvisation when the play and its purpose demand it. Yet he censures the habits of comic actors who play to the audience for easy laughs, as "...in the days of Tarleton and Kempe, / Before the stage was purg'd from barbarism....," though this censure must be qualified, as it has far too often not been, by the Prologue's criticism of the contemporary stage.

Brome also gives a vivid miniature picture of the "crude coil" of the actors squabbling over their costumes, wigs, and false beards.

== Critical responses ==
Brome's play touches upon so many themes and subjects – theatre itself; psychology and psychotherapy; sexuality and gender roles; lesbianism; colonialism and the alienness and "otherness" of foreign cultures; social satire and social justice; etc. – that many authors on these disparate subjects have discussed it or referred to it. The play stands as one "model for later antipodes-literature" and the utopian and dystopian literature to which it relates.

== A modern production ==
The Antipodes is unusual among Brome's plays in having received a prominent modern production, directed by Gerald Freedman. It was staged at the modern replica of Shakespeare's Globe Theatre in London in August 2000.
