= The Queen and Concubine =

Play by Richard Brome

The Queen and Concubine is a Caroline era stage play, a tragicomedy written by Richard Brome and first published in 1659. It has sometimes been called Brome's best tragicomedy.

== Publication and date ==
The play was first printed when it was included in the 1659 Brome collection Five New Plays, issued by the booksellers Andrew Crooke and Henry Brome (no relation to the dramatist). Its date of authorship and earliest stage production is uncertain; scholars have generally placed it c. 1635 or in the 1635–40 period.

== Genre ==
Of Brome's sixteen surviving plays (including The Late Lancashire Witches, his collaboration with Thomas Heywood), the vast majority are comedies; only three are tragicomedies. (Along with The Queen and Concubine, the others are The Lovesick Court and The Queen's Exchange.) Brome may have chosen the tragicomic form for Queen and Concubine because it allowed him to make, in a limited form and degree, a political commentary. Critics have noted that Queen and Concubine is a critique of royal tyranny and courtly sycophancy, issues that were pertinent in the 1630s, when King Charles I was conducting his period of personal rule and Parliament was prorogued. Brome is directly critical of religious support for tyrannous rulers: "priests are but the apes to kings, / And prostitute religion to their ends."

The play's strong theme of royal sexual immorality clearly did not apply to Charles, and would have given Brome an obvious defence against anyone who argued for an application of his critical views to the English scene. Yet this cover may not have been adequate: The Queen and Concubine has been suggested as the play that inspired the only suppression of the theatres in the Caroline era, when William Beeston was imprisoned and lost control of his theatre company in 1640.

Brome has never had a reputation as a dramatic poet; his verse generally does not rise above the perfunctory and prosaic. The verse in Queen and Concubine is far more formal and self-conscious than what is typical of Brome, and shows a greater effort of artistic composition. The play features two of the final uses of dumbshow in English Renaissance drama.

== Sources ==
Brome adapted the plot of Queen and Concubine from Penelope's Web (1587), a prose romance by Robert Greene. Greene's prose romances have received limited attention from scholars, critics, and readers of English literature; but they were fruitful in inspiring other writers – the most famous example of this being Shakespeare's use of Greene's Pandosto (1588) for his The Winter's Tale.

== Synopsis ==
Set in Sicily, the play centres on the rule of a fictional king named Gonzago. At the start of the play, Gonzago's army has just won a major victory over an unspecified foreign enemy. The victory, however, was nearly a defeat: the outcome of the battle was turned when the Sicilian general Sforza personally rescued Gonzago from the enemy forces that were about to overwhelm him. The celebrations of the victory dwell on Sforza's courage and prowess – to a degree that offends the touchy ego of the king. Capriciously, Gonzago decides to remove the popular and powerful Sforza from command and replace him with an old and superseded rival, Petruccio.

This decision presents the king with two complications. Sforza is a countryman of his queen, Eulalia, a faithful and devoted wife; and Sforza has a young and attractive daughter named Alinda. Eulalia has taken the young woman under her wing as a lady of her court. The king capriciously and ruthlessly sends Sforza to prison, and takes Alinda as his mistress; he mounts a false accusation of adultery against Eulalia, claiming that she and Sforza have had an affair. Gonzago's motive is to replace Eulalia as queen with Alinda – a move that Alinda herself supports: she quickly shows a ruthless ambition that matches the king's lack of principle.

These events at court are observed and commented upon by two courtiers, Lodovico and Horatio, who embody two contrasting responses. Lodovico is faithful and sincere, while Horatio is a sycophant who supports the king in whatever the king does, no matter how contemptible.

Gonzago stages a show trial on his queen's alleged infidelity. Eulalia is convicted on the perjured testimony of suborned witnesses, and exiled from the court. Citizens of the kingdom are forbidden from offering her any help; even food and drink are proscribed. Her followers are driven out of the court along with her; the most loyal of them, Lodovico and the fool Andrea, seek out Eulalia to offer her sustenance – but Eulalia is so loyal to the king that she refuses to violate his command by accepting their aid. While she is asleep, Eulalia is visited in a dream by her personal genius, her guiding spirit. The genius bestows a range of spiritual gifts upon her, including the ability to heal the sick, and he advises her on how to proceed in her exile. Eulalia sets herself up as a patron to the peasants of the countryside, healing their diseases and teaching young girls.

Back in the capital, Gonzago orders Petruccio to behead the imprisoned Sforza. Petruccio considers the order dishonorable, and when he interviews Sforza he finds that Sforza shares his own code of martial honour. Petruccio fakes Sforza's execution; and when the king turns against his own son and heir for the boy's continued loyalty to Eulalia, Petruccio conceals the prince (also named Gonzago) and spreads a false report that the boy is dead.

Alinda repeatedly sends assassins to murder Eulalia, though their attempts are frustrated by Eulalia's insight and the watchfulness of her peasant supporters. Alinda even acquiesces in her father's supposed execution. Eventually her guilty conscience effects her: she begins to show symptoms of mental breakdown, what Horatio calls "a moonflaw in her brains." Her ravings cool the king's ardor for her. When the soldiers mutiny over Sforza's reported execution, the king regrets his actions; Petruccio pacifies the revolt by showing that Sforza is still alive.

A now-repentant king seeks out Eulalia in her countryside retreat, and restores her queenship. (An element of comedy is injected by Horatio's increasingly desperate attempts to stay on the king's side as the king's fortunes veer wildly.) Under Eulalia's influence, Alinda's mental illness is cured; the young woman repents her sins and retires to a religious life. Gonzago also repents, and abdicates his throne in favour of his son; he too expresses his intention to retire to a monastery.
