= Thomas Stanley (author) =

English author and translator

Sir Thomas Stanley
- Born: 1625; Clothall, Hertfordshire
- Died: 12 April 1678 (aged 53); Suffolk Street, Strand, London
- Resting place: St Martin-in-the-Fields, London
- Education: B.A. (Cantab), M.A. (Cantab)
- Alma mater: Pembroke Hall, Cambridge
- Occupations: Writer and translator
- Spouse(s): Dorothy Emyon (died), Catherine Killigrew
- Children: 1 son, Thomas Stanley
- Writing career
- Language: English
- Notable works: The History of Philosophy, The History of Chaldaick Philosophy

Sir Thomas Stanley (1625 – 12 April 1678) was an English writer and translator.

== Life ==
He was baptised on 3 September 1625 in the parish of Clothall, Hertfordshire, the son of Sir Thomas Stanley and his wife, Mary Hammond. Thomas senior owned Cumberlow Manor, which stood at the south-eastern end of Clothall parish. Mary was the cousin of Richard Lovelace, and Stanley was educated in company with the son of Edward Fairfax, the translator of Tasso. He proceeded to Cambridge in 1637, in his thirteenth year, as a gentleman commoner of Pembroke Hall. In 1641, he took his M.A. degree, but seems by that time to have proceeded to Oxford. He subsequently embarked on a legal career, entering the Middle Temple in 1664 to study law.

He was wealthy, married early, and travelled much in Europe. He was the friend and companion, and at need the helper, of many poets, and was himself both a writer and a translator of verse. His portrait was painted by Sir Peter Lely and by Sir Godfrey Kneller; in all he was painted at least fifteen times.

== Writing ==
Stanley is the last of the metaphysical poets; born into a later generation than that of Edmund Waller and John Denham, he rejected their influence in prosody and forms of fancy. He admired Moschus, Ausonius, and the Pervigilium Veneris; among the moderns, Joannes Secundus, Góngora and Giambattista Marino.

Stanley's major work was The History of Philosophy, a series of critical biographies of philosophers, beginning with Thales; the life of Socrates included a blank verse translation of The Clouds of Aristophanes. It appeared in three volumes between 1655 and 1661. A fourth volume (1662), bearing the title of The History of Chaldaick Philosophy, was translated into Latin by Jean Le Clerc (Amsterdam, 1690). The three earlier volumes were published in an enlarged Latin version by Gottfried Olearius (Leipzig, 1711). In 1664 Stanley published in folio a monumental edition of the text of Aeschylus. Richard Bentley is said to have appreciated his scholarship, and to have made use of Stanley's notes, on Callimachus.

Edmund Gosse writes that "in no poet of the century is the negative quality of shrinking from ugliness and coarseness so defined as in Stanley, the world in which his fancy loved to wander being one of refined Arcadian beauty, rather chilly and autumnal, but inhabited by groups of nymphs and shepherds, who hung garlands of flowers on votive urns, or took hands in stately, pensive dances."

== Works ==
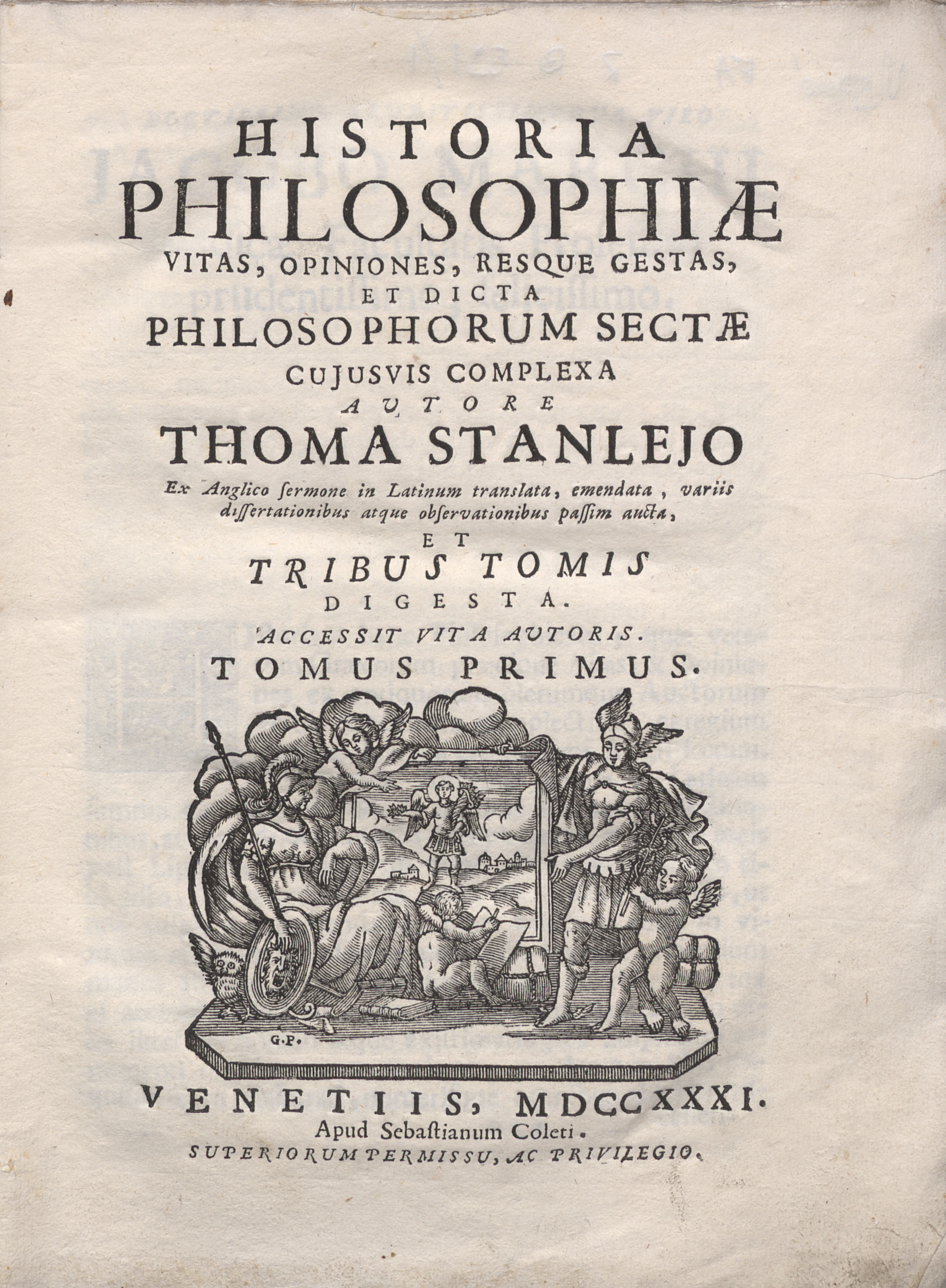
History of philosophy, 1731

- Poems (1647)
- Aurora and the Prince, from the Spanish of Juan Pérez de Montalbán; with Oronta, the Cyprian Virgin, from the Italian of Girolamo Preti (1647)
- Europa, Cupid Crucified, Venus Vigils (1649)
- Anacreon; Bion; Moschus; Kisses by Secundus..., a volume of translations (1651)
- The History of Philosophy (London, Humphrey Moseley and Thomas Dring) in 1655, three volumes, (1655, 1656, 1660); a fourth was published in 1662.
- "Psalterium Carolinum: The Devotions of His Sacred Majestie in His Solitudes And Sufferings" (1657), a verse rendering of the Eikon Basilike with music by John Wilson.
- Poems (1814) edited by Samuel Egerton Brydges
- Anacreon (1883) translation, edited by A. H. Bullen (with Greek original)

== Family and death ==
Stanley's wife was Dorothy Enyon, daughter and co-heiress of Sir James Enyon, of Flore, Northamptonshire, with issue Thomas Stanley (1650 – death unknown).

He died at his lodgings in Suffolk Street, Strand, London on 12 April 1678, and was buried in the church of St Martin-in-the-Fields, leaving a will proved on 6 May 1678 by his widow, Dorothy.
