= The Great Switcheroo =

Short story by Roald Dahl

- Author: Roald Dahl
- Language: English
- Published: 1974
- Publication place: United Kingdom

"The Great Switcheroo" is a short story by Roald Dahl.

== Plot ==
Vic Hammond and his wife Mary go to a cocktail party hosted by their neighbors and friends Jerry and Samantha Rainbow. Vic lusts after the difficult-to-seduce Samantha as she is faithful to her husband, so he devises a plan that would allow Vic and Jerry to switch wives for a night without the women knowing it. He puts the suggestion to Jerry in the form of a story and finally manages to lure Jerry into proposing that they should try out the plan. Many meetings are subsequently held between the two men in which they plan every detail of the scheme.

At one point, in order to ensure that the deception is as complete as possible, they even agree to describe the sexual routines they adopt when making love to their wives. Both men regard the other's approach with disdain. Vic, who is very proud of his own approach and sexual technique with his wife, is particularly outraged when Jerry criticizes his routine.

On the fateful night, the men are able to sneak into each other's bedrooms without incident. But in the middle of having sex with Samantha (in total darkness), Vic realizes that in the heat of things he has forgotten to copy Jerry's technique. Samantha, having at first tensed up after noticing the difference, suddenly responds with gusto, surprising Vic as she takes the lead and they vigorously make love.

Slipping out of bed afterward as their wives sleep, the men return home, full of glee at their own cleverness. Vic gets quite a shock the next morning, though, when his wife Mary admits that she's never really enjoyed sex with him… before last night (implying that Jerry similarly forgot or ignored Vic's particular routine).

== Publication ==
This story was published in Playboy magazine. It was included in the collection Switch Bitch published in 1974 by Michael Joseph Ltd.

The story was also released in 1977 as an audio recording on Caedmon Records (TC 1545) read by Patricia Neal.

== See also ==
- Rape by deception
