= Love Tricks =

Play by James Shirley

Love Tricks, or The School of Complement is a Caroline stage play by James Shirley, his earliest known work.

== Performance ==
Love Tricks was licensed for performance by Sir Henry Herbert, the Master of the Revels, on 10 February 1625; it was performed by the Lady Elizabeth's Men at the Cockpit Theatre (prior to the epidemic of bubonic plague that closed the London theatres for most of 1625).

Love Tricks was revived during the Restoration era; it was performed by the Duke's Company at Lincoln's Inn Fields. Samuel Pepys saw it on 5 August 1667.

== Publication ==
The play was published in 1631 under its subtitle, The School of Complement, in a quarto printed by Elizabeth Allde for the bookseller Francis Constable. The volume was dedicated to William Tresham. Other editions followed in 1637 and 1667. (The third edition of 1667 coincided with the revival that year, a common practice in the period.)

== Derivativeness ==
Critics have complained that drama in the Caroline era had become "conventionalized," with stronger debts to earlier plays than to actual life. Shirley's Love Tricks (its title is suggestive of John Day's 1604 play Law Tricks) bears a range of resemblances with earlier works. Jenkin the Welsh character resembles Fluellen in Shakespeare's Henry V, and other stage Welshmen; his two conversations with the echo recall earlier echo scenes in several previous plays. The quarrel among Jenkin, Bubulcus, and Gorgon over who will speak the Epilogue recalls the quarrel of the three pages over who will speak the Prologue in Jonson's Cynthia's Revels, while Gorgon the witty servant reaches back to ancient Latin comedy. Selina's disguise as a shepherd recalls Rosalind in As You Like It, among other examples. The play has been called "a patchwork of romance, humors, manners, farce, pastoral, and masque." The closing scenes are "Fletcherian pastoral," while the school of complement scenes are "Jonsonian humors." Shirley even names one of his characters Orlando Furioso.

== Sources ==
The main plot of the play, about the loves of Infortunio and Selina, derives from the tale of Phylotus and Emilia in the eighth novel of Barnabe Rich's Farewell to the Military Profession. The "school of complement" material in the play satirizes actual trends in Shirley's era, in which academies that could be considered finishing schools for adult gentry were a social reality [see: The New Academy].

== Synopsis ==
Infortunio is in love with Selina – but she is set to marry the elderly Rufaldo. The frustrated Infortunio loses his sanity, and wanders through the countryside. Selina, however, discovers that she does love Infortunio – but only on the eve of her wedding day. She disguises herself as a shepherd and runs away to the forest. Antonio, her brother, pretends to search for her; but he actually disguises himself in her wedding gown and takes her place in the wedding ceremony. His motive for this strange act? – Antonio is in love with Hilaria, Rufaldo's daughter; but Rufaldo wants Hilaria to marry the wealthy fool Bubulcus. Antonio-as-Selina knocks down "her husband" Rufaldo, and ridicules and humiliates him in public. Bubulcus pretends to have slain Antonio in a duel; he is arrested for this, since Antonio has disappeared (at least to the other characters, who cannot penetrate his disguise) and is believed dead.

Meanwhile, in the forest, the disguised Selina is living with a household of shepherds – which includes her long-lost sister Felice, who likewise ran away to escape an unwanted marriage. Infortunio, still mad, stumbles upon them, and Felice cures him by restoring Selina to him. Gasparo, Felice's past love, also shows up (with his servant Gorgon), and recognizes both Felice and Selina, who in turn are amazed to learn that Selina is thought to be still in the city (the effect of Antonio's disguise). A group from the city that includes Cornelio, the father of Antonio and the sisters, and Rufaldo, comes to view the shepherds' rustic sports; discoveries and reconciliations follow. The play ends with three happy couples: Infortunio and Selina, Antonio and Hilaria, and Gasparo and Felice.

Interspersed with this main plot are several comic episodes, most notably the "school of complement" material, and also the comedy of Jenkin, Jocarello, and Gorgon. In the school of compliment scene in Act III, Gasparo and Gorgon (as master and usher) teach a group of pupils to speak the kind of elaborate language associated with courtly behavior – though perhaps more typical of books of compliment and courtship than of actual courtiers. ("The Cupidinian fires burn in my breast..." is one sample of their eloquence.) As the pupils are rehearsing en masse, the mad Infortunio stumbles upon the scene, and mistakes the students for the damned souls of Hell. He knocks down the first man he encounters; and the others, intimidated, play along with his delusion and explain what led to their damnations. At least one critic has regarded this satire as "the best part of the play," though "unrelated to the main plot."
