= The English Moor =

Play by Richard Brome

The English Moor, or the Mock Marriage is a Caroline era stage play, a comedy written by Richard Brome, noteworthy in its use of the stage device of blackface make-up. Registered in 1640, it was first printed in 1659, and, uniquely among the plays of Brome's canon, also survives in a manuscript version.

== Date ==
The play was entered into the Stationers' Register on 4 August 1640, along with five other Brome plays, by Andrew Crooke; but it was not printed for another two decades. The title page of the 1659 first edition states that The English Moor was acted by Queen Henrietta's Men. Brome began writing for that company in 1637, once the London theatres had re-opened after a long closure during the bubonic plague epidemic of 1636–37. The English Moor may have been the first play that the Queen's Men staged in their new venue, the Salisbury Court Theatre, when they debuted there on 2 October 1637. Though this is not an absolute certainty, it is plausible; since Brome's previous play, The Sparagus Garden, had been one of the great theatre successes of the era, the company would sensibly have opened with a play by the most popular dramatist of the moment.

== Publication ==
The English Moor is the first of the five plays included in the 1659 octavo collection of Brome's works called Five New Plays (not to be confused with the 1653 Brome collection that bore exactly the same title). The 1659 collection was published by the stationers Andrew Crooke and Henry Brome (the latter is believed to have been no relation to the playwright). The 1659 text had two different title pages:

- one is dated 1658, with the author's name missing but the publishers' names included, and with a misprint in the Latin motto;
- the other is dated 1659, with the author's name included and the misprint corrected.

Copies of the 1659 volume exist with the first title page, or the second, or both. The play was not reprinted until the nineteenth century.

== Manuscript ==
The manuscript text of the play is in the collection of Lichfield Cathedral Library, where it is designated Lichfield MS. 68. The manuscript is a presentation copy of the play, sent to Brome's patron William Seymour, 2nd Duke of Somerset. (Brome also dedicated his play The Antipodes to Somerset upon its 1640 publication.) The MS. dedication is signed by Brome; both the dedication and the play itself appear to be in the same hand as the signature, indicating that the MS. is an authorial holograph – which would make sense in a presentation MS. to a noble patron. Watermarks in the paper suggest a date around 1640. The MS. text is not identical to the printed text; it shows a range of differences, minor and major, including the omission of politically sensitive material present in the printed version. In the octavo, for example, a speech in the second scene suggests that being called before the "High Commission" is worse than cutting one's throat or swallowing poison; since Somerset was a member of the Court of High Commission, the MS. tactfully leaves this passage out.

== Influences ==
Brome did not rely upon a single source for the plot of his play, though he was strongly influenced by the works of Ben Jonson, his model in most artistic and dramaturgical matters; the play's links with Epicene have been noted by critics. The play alludes to the device of blackface make-up employed in Jonson's The Masque of Blackness. Brome was also influenced by earlier works in city comedy and the writers in that subgenre. His play bears significant resemblances to Shackerley Marmion's A Fine Companion. The revenge plot in The English Moor has been seen as a comic version of the revenge plot handled for tragic effect in Middleton and Rowley's The Changeling.

== Synopsis ==
The play's intricate and complex multiple plot begins with two London neighbours, Meanwell and Rashly, who have been missing for the past year. Their children believe that they went abroad to fight a duel. Both men have two children, a son and daughter, who react variously to their perceived predicament. Rashly's son Theophilus, true to his family name, is a passionate and mercurial individual; he longs to fight his own duel against Meanwell's son Arthur to avenge his father's death – but is frustrated by Arthur's self-imposed seclusion. His sister Lucy is much less enthusiastic about her brother's thirst for revenge, because she is secretly in love with Arthur. Meanwell's children reverse the normal and expected social roles of gender: Arthur is mild-tempered and returns Lucy's affection, but his sister Dionisia is a "virago" who longs for her own revenge upon the Rashlys.

Theophilus is friends with a trio of young gallants, all of whom have suffered financially by mortgaging property to the old usurer Mandeville Quicksands. One of the trio in Nathaniel Banelass, a ruthless womaniser (as his name indicates, he is the "bane" of "lasses"). Nathaniel has just seduced and abandoned Phyllis; when she upbraids him for his conduct to her, he tells her to turn whore. Nathaniel and his friends Vincent and Edmund are delighted to learn that Quicksands has married the beautiful young Millicent; they optimistically expect opportunities to cuckold the old moneylender. Millicent, however, is Theophilus's love interest; when Nathaniel and his friends tell Theophilus of the news and their hopes, the hot-tempered Theophilus is so outraged that he draws his sword on Nathaniel. In the fight, Nathaniel is slightly wounded; Vincent and Edmund draw in his defence, so that Theophilus faces three-to-one odds. A passing stranger, seeing the unfair odds, draws his sword and helps Theophilus drive off his opponents. The stranger happens to be Arthur, disguised with a false beard; only when the fight is over does Arthur realise that he has stood on the side of his supposed enemy. He flees the scene, leaving Theophilus irate that he owes a debt of honour to an unknown man.

Quicksands and Millicent are shown on their wedding day, in the company of Millicent's uncle Testy, an irritable and capricious old judge. Testy has arranged the marriage against his niece's will, and orders her to "shake off" her "maiden peevishness" and love her husband. Millicent tries to be the obedient female at first, but she is so browbeaten by her uncle that she rebels: she sings bawdy songs to Quicksands, calls him "Chick" among other endearments, and assures him that she can bear six babies in five years — whether Quicksands is up to the task of begetting them or not. The two old men are shocked and embarrassed by her bawdry; Quicksands in particular is at a nonplus, and now feels inhibited from his wedding-night obligations. The discomfort is accentuated when the courtiers, masked and costumed as horned animals, break in with an impromptu wedding masque that strongly suggests inevitable cuckoldry. In the end, Quicksands hopes that a night of undisturbed sleep will restore his bride's modesty; Millicent has the last word with a closing couplet: "[...] to bed, to bed, / No bride so glad – to keep her maidenhead."

Rather than turn whore, Phyllis becomes the new lady's maid to Lucy; she quickly divines Lucy's love for Arthur, and is happy to promote it. Theophilus dislikes Phyllis's talkativeness and informality, and angrily dismisses the new maid; but he has no trouble patching up his quarrel with Nathaniel. Quicksands has no luck at managing his new wife: after he foolishly accuses her of complicity with the masquers of the previous day, the offended Millicent gains his vow to respect her virginity for the next month. Quicksands develops a plan to outwit the courtiers who oppress him: he promulgates a story that Millicent has left him and gone into the country. She actually stays in his house, in disguise: Quicksands dresses her up as a Moorish servant, with blackface make-up and a veil. (She is the "English Moor" of the title.) When she complains about the "black painting", asking "Would you blot out / Heaven's workmanship?" he counters "Has heaven no part in Aegypt? Pray thee tell me, / Is not an Ethiopes face his workmanship / As well as the fair'st Ladies?" Phyllis resurfaces as the confidential lady's maid who will wait on Millicent and keep the secret of her disguise.

Dionisia discovers her brother Arthur's love of Lucy, from papers in his room; she acts out her virago urges by dressing as a man, complete with sword and pistol, to exact her revenge upon the Rashlys. She wins admittance to the Rashly house by claiming to be Millicent's brother; but once there, she falls in love with Theophilus and cannot work the violence she planned. Quicksands, still hoping for his own revenge, feigns a reconciliation with the courtiers; they come to his house for another masque. The relentless Nathaniel, unable to locate Millicent, now sets his sights on seducing Quicksands' new Moorish servant; and Millicent leads him on. Nathaniel does indeed have sex with a woman in Moorish disguise; they are caught in the act and exposed. Millicent flees Quicksands' house, escorted by a kind stranger – who is again the disguised Arthur in his false beard. He brings her to the Rashly house, putting Theophilus in his debt once again.

Later on it becomes apparent that Meanwell and Rashly are not dead after all; they return from France, having rescued Phyllis's father Winloss from incarceration there. Six years earlier, the two men had bankrupted Winloss in a lawsuit, forcing him abroad; now they have made up for their former action by reprieving him from debtors' prison in Dunkirk. The revenge motive for Theophilus and Dionisia is suddenly negated. In the play's resolution, Quicksands is now determined to divorce Millicent and terminate his unconsummated "mock marriage," and justice Testy agrees. Nathaniel also agrees to marry the woman he has seduced, in the mistaken belief that she is Millicent. It is revealed, however, that Nathaniel's lover in Moorish guise was actually Phyllis, and that Nathaniel has inadvertently "done the right thing" by agreeing to marry the woman he'd seduced (or at least, the woman he'd seduced most recently). The play's true lovers, Arthur and Lucy, and Theophilus and Millicent, are able to unite at play's end. Quicksands is manipulated into returning the mortgages of the three courtiers; and Dionisia vows repentance for her violence-prone cross-dressing nature.

== Critical response ==
Critics both traditional and modern have expressed appreciation for the play's effective plotting, but reservations about its matter – especially its sexual material (the bed trick switch of Phyllis for Millicent) and the device of blackface make-up. Nineteenth-century critics found these offensive on the grounds of vulgarity; modern commentators have focused on the same matters, but from more egalitarian perspectives.
