= The Northern Lass =

Play written by Richard Brome

The Northern Lass is a Caroline era stage play, a comedy by Richard Brome that premiered onstage in 1629 and was first printed in 1632. A popular hit, and one of his earliest successes, the play provided a foundation for Brome's career as a dramatist.

== Performance and publication ==
The Northern Lass was acted by the King's Men at both the Globe and Blackfriars theatres, "with good applause." So states the title page of the 1632 first quarto, printed by Augustine Matthews for the bookseller Nicholas Vavasour. In the original quarto, Brome dedicated the play to Richard Holford. Holford was a member of Gray's Inn, and owned land next to the site of the Cockpit Theatre, where future Brome plays would be produced. Though little is known about Holford or his connection with Brome, it is possible that Holford helped Brome with the legal terminology included in Northern Lass.

The first edition contains prefatory verses praising the play and its author, written by Ben Jonson, John Ford, and Thomas Dekker among others. The poem by Jonson begins with the lines, often quoted in the critical literature on Jonson and Brome, that record Brome's evolution from Jonson's former manservant to his fellow dramatist —

I had you for a servant once, Dick Brome;
And you perform'd a servant's faithfull parts;
Now, you are got into a nearer room,
Of fellowship, professing my old arts.

The popular play was revived and republished during the Restoration era; the second edition of 1663 added the subtitle A Nest of Fools to Brome's title. Subsequent editions tended to coincide with stage revivals – so that the play was both revived onstage and republished in 1684, in 1706/7, and in 1717. (Another edition was printed in Dublin in 1726.)

== Synopsis ==
The opening scene introduces Sir Philip Luckless, the play's hero, and his kinsman Triedwell. Triedwell is concerned that Luckless has become engaged to a wealthy lawyer's widow, Mistress Audrey Fitchow. Triedwell is concerned that such a woman, who might be a suitable match for "some hard-bred citizen, crafty lawyer, or country justice", is inappropriate for a "tender nurseling of the Court" like his cousin. Sir Philip, however, is determined to pursue the match. The two men are interrupted by Mrs. Fitchow's brother Widgine and his companion and self-styled tutor Captain Anvil. Widgine quickly reveals himself to be a fool, while Anvil is a poseur and opportunist eager to exploit him.

Sir Philip is also approached by an unknown gentlewoman called Mistress Trainwell, who speaks to him about a promise of marriage and presents him with a letter signed "Constance". Here, Luckless makes the mistake upon which the plot turns: he thinks that this Constance is one Constance Holdup, a loose woman with whom he had had a brief sexual relationship, and that Mrs. Trainwell is her bawd. Actually, the Constance who wrote the letter is a "pretty gentlewoman" who is the niece of a local judge, Sir Paul Squelch. Luckless had met her briefly, and paid his gentlemanly compliments to her — which the naive young woman mistook for an offer of marriage. Mrs. Trainwell is her governess.

(Constance hails from Durham and speaks with a Yorkshire accent throughout the play – making her a northern lass. Hers is not the only dialect material in Brome's text: the minor comic character Sir Salomon Nonsense is from Cornwall and speaks with a Cornish accent.)

Sir Philip's cousin Triedwell tries to break off Luckless's engagement with Mrs. Fitchow; he goes to the widow to tell her "How lewd and dissolute he is", and how his fortunes have suffered by his extravagances. Fitchow, however, is too cagy to be manipulated; she handles Triedwell with ease, and to his own shock Triedwell finds himself strongly attracted to her. Fitchow, however, thinks that Luckless must have had a hand in his cousin's action, and she suspects that he is having second thoughts about marrying her. Her brother Widgine, infected by the atmosphere of the coming marriage, becomes infatuated with Fitchow's description of the "northern lass" who is Squelch's niece, and wants Fitchow to arrange a marriage for him – despite the fact that neither Widgine or Fitchow has ever even met the girl.

Squelch confronts Luckless about his niece, and questions Luckless's intentions toward her. Luckless admits that upon their first meeting "I did love the lass so well, and at the first sight, that had I not been otherwise allotted ... she should have been my bride ... ." He makes this admission in Mrs. Fitchow's hearing, which only stokes the widow's growing ill feelings. Luckless prevails on Fitchow to marry him a day earlier than planned. At their wedding feast, Triedwell, Mrs. Trainwell, and Constance slip into the Fitchow house costumed and masked, and perform a wedding masque for the assembled company. Constance sings during the masque, and her voice is recognised. The masquers pass letters to the principals before leaving as mysteriously as they came; and through his letter Luckless realises his foolish mistake about the two Constances. Fitchow is offended by all of this, and locks herself in her room, refusing to consummate their marriage on the wedding night.

Constance, feeling that Sir Philip has repudiated her, falls into a melancholy, in which she talks distractedly; her uncle characterises her state as "direct lunacy and idiotism". Trainwell, however, offers her compassionate care, and starts conspiring with Triedwell to manipulate events toward a positive outcome. The later scenes of the play are occupied with complex plotting, disguises, and busy comings and goings among humorous servants and justices and constables. Triedwell beats Anvil, forcing him in effect to switch sides from Fitchow's faction to Luckless's; he even makes Anvil carry a rope's end around with him, so it will be handy whenever Triedwell wants to beat him again.

Sir Paul Squelch, exasperated at the disorder around him, decides to indulge himself and take a mistress; he settles on the same Constance Holdup who figured in Luckless's confusion. He conceals her by representing her as his niece. This development allows Triedwell and Trainwell to work the trick that resolves the plot. Luckless and Fitchow have agreed to divorce – failure to consummate a marriage being one of the few grounds for divorce allowed by English law at the time. Yet Fitchow will not allow the divorce to be finalised until she hears that Constance is married; she cannot tolerate the thought that Luckless will have the girl he wants after the divorce. Triedwell and Trainwell fool Widgine into thinking that Constance Holdup is the judge's niece; he mistakenly elopes with the "bad" Constance, and Fitchow allows the divorce to be finalised. This frees Sir Philip and the "good" Constance to be married – which cures her melancholia. Mrs. Trainwell gets Sir Paul Squelch to marry her to boot. Most of the characters are happy, or at least content, by the play's end; even Mrs. Fitchow is pacified, once Constance Holdup frees Fitchow's brother Widgine from his commitment to her, for a fee of a hundred pounds.

== Music ==
The abundance of music in The Northern Lass has drawn critical attention, as part of the evolution of dramatic music toward opera on the seventeenth-century stage. Constance, the heroine and title character, sings four full songs during the play, plus snatches of two others; her double, Constance Holdup, sings two songs, plus a miniature duet with Widgine. Widgine also sings a song of his own, in which he is supported by a chorus of other cast members. (Constance and Constance Holdup never appear on stage in the same scene – which suggests that one vocally-talented boy actor doubled the two roles.)

The play therefore tends to resemble a modern musical comedy, more so than most plays of its era. The 1706 edition of the play included musical settings for its songs, composed by Daniel Purcell, the younger brother of Henry Purcell.

== Marriage ==
The picture of marriage provided by The Northern Lass is notably cynical. Mrs. Trainwell describes an unhappy marriage in these terms:

There's tugging for a mastery, and buffeting for the breeches. He barks at her, she snaps at him; she breaks his wine glass, he her looking glass; she puts away his servants, he turns away hers; she locks her chamber door, he bolts his, begetting nothing but a world of strife and disorder.

Mistress Fitchow, the play's stereotypical wealthy widow and a "threatening embodiment of dominance", delivers a vivid expression of her side of the marital contest, in her itemised list of things to do "for after marriage" —

To have the whole sway of the house, and all domestic affairs ... To study and practice the art of jealousy; to feign anger, melancholy, or sickness, to the life ... These are arts that women must be well-practic'd in ... and ought to be the only study of a widow, from the death of her first husband, to the second; from the second to the third ... And so proportionably to the seventh, if she be so long bless'd with life ... Besides, in all, to be singular in our will; to reign, govern, ordain laws and break 'em, make quarrels and maintain 'em; profess truths, devise falsehoods; protest obedience, but study nothing more than to make our husbands so; control, controvert, contradict, and be contrary to all conformity ... Then does a husband tickle the spleen of a woman, when she can anger him, to please him; chide him, to kiss him; mad him, to humble him; make him stiff-necked, to supple him; and hard-hearted, to break him; to set him up, and take him down, and up again, and down again, when, and as often as we list.

The bond between Constance and Sir Philip Luckless is presented in more conventionally idealised romantic terms; but Constance disappears from the play well before the final scene, while Mrs. Fitchow is present to the end.
