= The Late Lancashire Witches =

Play written by Thomas Heywood and Richard Brome

The Late Lancashire Witches is a Caroline-era stage play and written by Thomas Heywood and Richard Brome, published in 1634. The play is a topical melodrama on the subject of the witchcraft controversy that arose in Lancashire in 1633.

== Performance ==
The play was performed by the King's Men at the Globe Theatre. It was a popular success; it ran for three consecutive days in August 1634, at a time when plays were normally changed daily in a repertory system.

== Date and collaboration ==
It was once thought that Brome revised an old play by Heywood to make it pertinent to the situation in the early 1630s, generating a work that is roughly 90 per cent Heywood and 10 per cent Brome. Modern scholarship argues that the dramatists' extensive use of court documents shows that Heywood and Brome wrote a new play in 1633–34 to capitalise on a current public affair, producing a work that is much closer to an equal collaboration. The 1634 quarto was printed by Thomas Harper for the bookseller Benjamin Fisher, with a Prologue addressed by Heywood to the Earl of Dorset.

== Genre ==
The Late Lancashire Witches belongs to a subgenre of English Renaissance drama that exploited public interest in the scandalous subject of witchcraft. The most famous of these plays is Shakespeare's Macbeth (c. 1603–6), though Middleton's The Witch (c. 1609–16) and The Witch of Edmonton (1621) by Thomas Dekker, John Ford, and William Rowley, are other notable examples.

The 1633–34 prosecution was the sequel to a larger trial of the Pendle witches in 1612, the major affair of its kind in English history, which resulted in nine people from the Pendle Hill area of Lancashire being hanged at Lancaster Moor. The second episode was unresolved when the two playwrights wrote their play; the dramatists were working so close to events that they had no firm conclusion – the play's Epilogue assumes the guilt of the four women who were the prime suspects but admits that "the ripeness yet of time / Has not reveal'd" the final outcome. (In fact, Edmund Robinson, the ten-year-old boy who was the prosecutors' chief witness, later admitted subornation of perjury; King Charles I pardoned all seventeen people convicted.) The Lord Chamberlain of that time, Philip Herbert, 4th Earl of Pembroke, may have prompted the creation of the play for political reasons.

== Plot ==
The play depicts an area of Lancashire within riding distance of Lancaster. Historically, this would be Pendle Hill. The action switches freely from being outdoor, or in the house of Master Generous, the house of the Seely family, the home where Mall Spencer works as a maid, at a mill, or in a barn.

There is a Prologue, which uses a conventional apology for not having a better subject, referring the audience to the ‘witches the fat jailor brought to town’. These convicted witches were in the Fleet Prison, awaiting a decision from the Privy Council as to whether the executions (they and others had been found guilty in court in Lancaster) should go ahead. The ‘fat jailer’ might have been Thomas Covell, in charge of the prison at Lancaster Castle.

ACT 1, scene I. Three gentlemen, Arthur, Shakestone and Bantam have had their hunting disrupted by inexplicable events. To them enters Whetstone, nephew of Mistress Generous, and presumptive heir to Master Generous. Whetstone has a ‘Cratyltic’ name, in reference to an adage that no whetstone is needed to put an edge on a liar’s tongue. Socially insecure (he was the illegitimate son of Mistress Generous’ sister), Whetstone is scorned by the other men, but they have all agreed to dine at Master Generous’ house. Master Generous himself enters, to invite them in. The conversation shifts to the strange inversion of all authority in the local Seely household.

Act I scene ii. Doughty is trying to reason with Old Seely about his abject submission to the will of his son Gregory. This is then demonstrated in the dialogue, with the servant of the household, Lawrence, coming in to command both his social superiors. Seely’s wife Joan is also revealed to be subjugated by her daughter Winny, then both of the women to the maidservant Parnell. Lawrence and Parnell speak in Brome’s version of the Lancashire dialect (simplified in the Egan text). Doughty comments incredulously throughout, and deduces: “Sure all the witches in the country [we would use ‘county’ here] have their hands in this home-spun medley”. Lawrence and Parnell agree to marry and take over as masters, with the Seely family reduced to lodgers.

ACT 2 scene i This scene introduces the sisterhood of witches who have gleefully caused all the disruption seen in Act 1. An extraordinary song in which the witches offer their blood to feed their familiars is sung, and future mischief planned.

Act 2 Scene ii. Inside the Generous household, Generous asks the three gentlemen to be forbearing about Whetstone’s folly. Arthur flatters Generous, the men attend to various legal documents together, at last the three gentleman and Whetstone leave to go hare coursing again. Left on his own, Generous asks his servant Robin, who has entered the scene, to call his Mistress. Robin explains that he cannot, that she is out of the house, alone, on horseback. Though he is disconcerted, Generous makes a conscious effort not to become a suspicious husband, but tells Robin to refuse to let Mistress Generous have a horse next time she demands one. The next entry is a soldier, begging his way home: his dialogue with Generous is interrupted by Generous’ miller, who is leaving his employment because of nocturnal assaults on his sleep by large cats. The soldier says he used to be a miller, and he takes the job instead.

Act 2 iii is a short scene dramatizing the boy who originally spun this whole story of witches. The boy finds two stray greyhounds, as he thinks.

Act 2 iv shows the gentlemen coursing again, with their hunting disrupted this time by a quarrel largely triggered by Bantam (the name connotes a small fighting cock). Bantam flatly calls Whetstone a bastard.

Act 2 v. The boy finds that the greyhounds just will not hunt. As he whips them with a switch, the dogs metamorphose into Goody Dickieson and a devil boy. They abduct the boy together.

Act 2 vi. Robin, sent to Lancaster to buy wine by Generous in the second scene, is seen with his lover, Mall Spencer, whose magical powers are demonstrated. She swaps his grey horse to a long backed black horse, saying that they can both ride to London and back, and get wine from no less than the Mitre Tavern itself (the play has a lot of ‘product placement’).

ACT 3 scene i. Old Seely and Joan are working in the kitchen like servants, preparing the wedding feast for their own servants Lawrence and Parnell, who are being married at the church by Parson Knitknot. The whole party from the church enter joyously, though the wedding bells have been ringing an alarm, rather than a proper peal. Like the bells, the wedding feast is then disrupted by the familiar spirits. The bridal cake turns to bran, and all the cooked meat in the elaborate feast is supernaturally switched for inedible or satirical things (dollops of cow shit, ram’s horns, etc.), finally live birds fly out of the wedding pie (kittens were also used on stage in 1634). The wedding guests nearly panic, but rally to stay in the house, and cold meat is found to make some kind of collation. The charm that he held the Seely family lifts temporarily. They aim to make a merry afternoon, with the encouraging presence of Mall Spencer, merely seen as a merry wench.

Act 3, ii. Generous and Robin are in dialogue about the extraordinary quality of the wine Robin has purchased for his master. Robin affirms he got it from the Mitre Tavern itself, but Generous is incredulous. Robin even produces a valuable document a worker at the Mitre had found, dropped by Generous. But Generous just rationalises this away, and leaves the scene. Mistress Generous enters, and demands a horse: Robin refuses, but with a magical bridle she transforms him into a mount to carry her to the meeting of the sisterhood. Act 3 iii. Back at the wedding party, dialogue reveals that Doughty, an older man, is now enamoured of Mall Spencer. Doughty is seen dancing with Mall, during which her nose is (apparently) briefly transformed into a crone’s hooked nose. Lawrence the bridegroom wants Parnell to perform some unspecified sexual act with him ahead of bedtime. Mall gives to Lawrence an enchanted ‘point’, a lace to retain the flap of his codpiece – it will render him impotent, but not knowing this, he fastens it in place. The music for the dancing turns into a cacophony of different tunes, and then the instruments are supernaturally silenced. But it is remembered that bagpipes resist magic (an effect used in the preposterous Ken Russell horror film, ‘The Lair of the White Worm’). The piper is invited in, everyone performs a drunken reel, but finally Mall and the piper vanish. Doughty now decides that the whole day has been subjected to witchcraft. The bride and groom go to bed as the act ends.

ACT 4 scene i starts at the barn where Mistress Generous dismounts from Robin and enters to join the sisterhood, who will feast on the wedding feast spirited away in the previous act. Robin peers in, and comments on what he sees (it is of interest that he reports on just a female company assembled, and makes no testimony to the devil being present). As was historically alleged by the boy Edmund Robinson, the food descends from above when the witches tug on ropes. The boy abducted by Good Dickieson is present, his testimony is that the food is vitiated, and has, as he puts it, ‘neither salt or savour’. He escapes, and the witches find that they cannot pursue him without being witnessed, so they hastily break up their party. When Mistress Generous thinks to ride Robin back to her house, he snatches the magic bridle and rides her instead.

4 ii is the serious part of the play. Generous enters, thoughtful about his wife: her bed has not been slept in. He calls for Robin to check on his horses, and asks for the stable key. Robin knows that he will find an unknown mare in the stable (Mistress Generous transformed into a horse by the magic bridle). Generous re-enters, furious with Robin for giving free stabling to another person’s horse. Robin persuades his master that this horse is his own, and that he has stabled this mare for twenty years and more: Generous should just go the stable and take off the bridle. Generous returns, stupefied by what has happened in the stable. Mistress Generous, completely incriminated, confesses to witchcraft, and to having made a full pact with the devil. Generous, the sceptic, is confuted, and now witchcraft lore fills his mind as truth: he can now imagine that he has often slept with a succubus, left by his side while she has been out with her fellow witches. Mistress Generous expresses great contrition, and either weeps or seems to weep (a pacted witch was not supposed to be able to do this), and her husband decides to believe in her penitence, and tells Robin to keep quiet about what he has seen.

In 4 iii, we learn that the Seely family have been separated and taken into care, Arthur housing the young, Doughty the old couple. The noise of a skimmington ride is heard: Shakestone enters to expound. Discovering her husband to be impotent, Parnell has been so noisily irate that her scandalised neighbours are caricaturing them as ‘Don Skimmington’ and his shrewish wife (imagine pasteboard figures on horseback, accompanied by villagers beating on pans, etc.). Parnell enters, her sexual dissatisfaction loud and, to the mind of the gentlemen, immodest (she had prior experience of how virile Lawrence once was, but now she says she wants a divorce). The mocking skimmington parade enters, and a street brawl starts, as Parnell attacks the puppet husband, Lawrence the puppet wife. Parnell even thinks she has drawn blood (the reference is to scratching a witch, and in drawing blood, freeing yourself from the power of her charm).

Act 4 scene iv opens with dialogue between Mistress Generous and Mall Spencer about Mistress Generous’ exposure to her husband. In this dialogue we learn that all her penitence was just acting, “but once and ever / A witch, thou know’st” – a witch does not repent. Whetstone enters, and he wants to use his aunt’s powers to retaliate on the gentlemen for abusing him, Mistress Generous hastily gives him a paper with instructions. Act 4 scene v is the masque of putative fathers that gives Whetstone his moment on revenge on the gentlemen. After an evening drinking together, he asks (he being a known bastard) if they would like to see their fathers, and in the masque-like series of entries that follows, a tailor, a schoolteacher, and Robin the servant are apparently revealed as the true fathers of these self-conscious gentlemen. Whetstone’s own father is also shown, and is at least proved to have been a gallant. The gentlemen find they have no power to retaliate for this humiliation. In a final dialogue section, Mistress Generous gets Mall to summon the sisterhood together, prior to another assault on the mill.

ACT 5 scene i This act opens with a dialogue that heads towards the resolution on the action: Doughty is now a witch-finder, with the boy as his informant, determined to purge the county of witches. The boy seems to be elaborating his story because of the attention he is getting: we have not witnessed his fight with the devil boy that he describes.

Act 5 scene ii is the assault on the mill by the witches and their familiars, the witches in the form of cats. The soldier-turned-miller fights back with his sword, and has wounded one of his assailants, he thinks.

Act 5 scene 3 has Generous and Robin in dialogue, heading for the mill. Arthur enters to confront Robin about daring to have impersonated his father (Arthur and the other gentlemen are now freed from the delusion induced at the end of Act IV). Arthur is confounded when Generous can attest that Robin was always with him. At the mill, Generous talks to the soldier, who describes the assault, and his belief that he wounded one of the cats. Generous is again confronted by proof: the cat’s severed paw has become his wife’s hand, complete with wedding ring.

In 5 iv the wounded Mistress Generous is lying in bed. Whetstone talks fatuously to her, Mall, who is present, realises that she must escape, but she is intercepted by the arrival of the men. Generous forces his wife to reveal her injury, she and Mall are delivered into ‘the hand of justice’.

In 5 v, the power of the witches has been broken by the arrests. The Seely household are all restored to their wits and proper sense of social position, Parnell very excitedly describes how she and her husband worked out how to deliver him from Mall Spencer’s incapacitating sexual charm (Brome works in a lot of bawdy, the point burning in the fire is really a description of their successful sexual congress at last). Old Seely can now recollect how he had encountered and rebuked a ‘wayward’ (weird) woman for bearing with a ‘most unseemly disobedience’ in her own son, and the retaliatory curse she passed on him for these sharp remarks: that he would soon experience the same. Master Generous arrives with his wife and Mall, Old Seely has to be warned about Mistress Generous’ witchcraft. Arthur and Doughty together take control. The accused women find that they cannot conjure up their familiars, and Doughty expounds that even a village constable (i.e., the lowest officer of the Christian state) has power over witchcraft in his staff (imagine a truncheon with the royal coat of arms). Arthur proposes that they try to take statements now, to speed up the later legal process. The various accusations are repeated, and the accused women say that they will not speak, but then Granny Johnson does, calling out loud for Mamilion her familiar, and confessing to her sexual relationship with this demonic familiar. Historically, Margaret Johnson spontaneously confessed to witchcraft, when she had not been one of the 1634 accused at all. As ‘the penitent witch’, she appears in the State Papers, and multiple copies of her confession were made. Having got what he wants from this confession, Doughty ceases to ‘dandle’ (treat with apparent kindness) this witch, and the male characters end the play with Robin leading the jeering: he expects Mall and Mistress Generous to be mounted next on a ‘horse’ with a ‘bridle’, the gallows and the halter which will hang them. Doughty addresses the constable and others “On afore, drovers, with your untoward cattle”: as men herding cattle to an abattoir.

The play ends with a shifty Epilogue, claiming that the action has represented no more than the accused people have done, but admitting that ‘great mercy’ may yet give the accused their lives. The action has shown the entirely fictional Mistress Generous given her chance when first incriminated, and yet returning to her practices. Thomas Potts asserted that Jennet Preston in the 1612 Pendle Hill witchcraft was “unfit to live, having once so great mercie extended to her”, and Heywood seems to be picking up this detail.

== Adaptation ==
Thomas Shadwell borrowed from the Heywood/Brome work for his own The Lancashire Witches (1682). Shadwell's play was also popular through much of the 18th century; as late as 1782, Charles Dibdin had a success with his pantomime The Lancashire Witches, or The Distresses of Harlequin. The Heywood/Brome and Shadwell versions were reprinted together in an 1853 volume titled The Poetry of Witchcraft.

== Modern editions ==
Laird Barber produced a modern edition of the play in 1979, under its traditional title. When Gabriel Egan produced another modern edition in 2002, he employed the title The Witches of Lancashire, in the judgement that this reflected the play as performed in 1634. (The second title derives from a letter dated 16 August 1634 written by Nathaniel Tomkyns, a member of the audience. The run-on title in the 1634 quarto, positioned along the tops of the pages, is also The Witches of Lancashire.)
