= Thomas Dring =

English publisher and bookseller

Thomas Dring (died 1668) was a London publisher and bookseller of the middle seventeenth century. He was in business from 1649 on; his shop (as his title pages indicate) was located "at the sign of the George in Fleet Street, near St. Dunstan's Church."

== Drama ==
Much like his contemporary William Cooke, Thomas Dring specialized in the publication of law books, but also issued works in a range of subjects including English Renaissance drama. In the latter subject, his most significant single project was the Five New Plays of 1653, an important collection of the dramas of Richard Brome that Dring published in partnership with Humphrey Moseley and Richard Marriot. Dring also issued first or later editions of other plays of the period:

- Walter Montague's masque The Shepherd's Paradise, 1659
- Sir Robert Stapylton's The Slighted Maid, 1663
- James Shirley's Love Tricks, 1667 (the 3rd edition)
- Thomas Middleton and William Rowley's The Changeling, 1668 (2nd edition)
- Thomas Tomkis's Albumazar, 1668 (5th edition).

== Other works ==
Beyond the confines of drama, Dring issued volumes of poetry by John Harington, Sir Edward Sherburne, and Edward, Lord Herbert. In partnership again with Humphrey Moseley, Dring published Thomas Stanley's important 3-volume History of Philosophy (1655–61). Independently, Dring issued Stanley's edition of Claudius Aelianus (1665). Dring produced other books of serious nonfiction, including the anonymous and rather startlingly titled Modern Policies, Taken from Machiavel, Borgia, and Other Choice Authors (1652).

As was commonly done in his era, Dring sometimes partnered with other stationers for major projects (as with Moseley and Marriot, noted above). For Franz Schott's lavishly illustrated Italy in Its Original Glory (1660), Dring worked with John Place and Henry Twyford; for César de Rochefort's History of the Caribby Islands (1666), Dring shared responsibility with John Starkey.

Though he generally maintained a respectable reputation, Dring's career also showed a few of the questionable involvements that were common among the stationers of his era. In 1650 he published Robert Baron's Pocula Castalia. Baron was a notable plagiarist; his 1650 verse collection consisted mainly of the work of John Milton. In 1658 Dring published a work by "H. W." called The Accomplish'd Courtier, an unacknowledged translation of Eustache de Refuge's Traicté de la Cour (1617).

Dring's date of death is not known; his last will and testament was dated 12 September 1668, and was probated on 21 December that year. He was survived by two sons, Thomas and Joshua.

== Dring the younger ==
His son Thomas Dring the younger continued his father's business into the 1680s, "at the sign of the White Lion next Chancery Lane end, in Fleet Street." Like his father, the younger Dring published law books and works on public affairs, plus plays and general literature. In a brief period in the 1670s the younger Dring issued a group of noteworthy play texts:

- Aphra Behn's The Amorous Prince, 1671
  - and her The Dutch Lover, 1673
- The Rehearsal, by George Villiers, 2nd Duke of Buckingham and others, 1672
- Edward Ravenscroft's The Citizen Turned Gentleman, 1672
- Henry Nevil Payne's The Fatal Journey, 1673
  - and his The Morning Ramble, also 1673
- William Wycherley's The Gentleman Dancing-Master, 1673 (partnered with Henry Herringman)
  - and his The Country Wife, 1675.

In non-dramatic literature, the younger Dring's most notable book was arguably the 1673 second edition of Milton's shorter poems.
