= The Weeding of Covent Garden =

1659 play written by Richard Brome

The Weeding of the Covent Garden, or the Middlesex Justice of Peace, alternatively titled The Covent Garden Weeded, is a Caroline era stage play, a comedy written by Richard Brome that was first published in 1659. The play is a noteworthy satire on the emerging ethos of Capitalism as reflected in real estate and urban development in the early modern city.

The precise dates of authorship and first performance of the play are not known with certainty; but it must have originated c. 1632, when the development of Covent Garden was a public controversy. The play may have been staged by the King's Men.

The Weeding of Covent Garden was first published in the 1659 octavo volume Five New Plays, a collection of Brome's dramas issued by the booksellers Andrew Crooke and Henry Brome.

== Covent Garden ==
Even in the first half of the 17th century, major urban developments were subjects of intense dispute. In both the Elizabethan and the Jacobean eras, regulations had been promulgated to control the urban sprawl that was then uniting London with nearby Westminster. The last open spaces between the two were under pressure in the early 17th century: the area of Lincoln's Inn Fields was partially developed, leaving Covent Garden – the former "convent garden" attached to Westminster Abbey – as the next obvious target for exploitation.

In January 1631, the land's owner, Francis Russell, 4th Earl of Bedford, obtained from King Charles I the waiver of the legal restrictions on new building that he needed for a large building project centred on a Continental-style piazza. (The waiver cost Bedford £2000; Charles had dismissed Parliament and begun his eleven-year period of personal rule, and needed the money.)

== Inigo Jones ==
While Isaac de Caux was the architect for the row houses on the north and east sides of the square, Inigo Jones designed St. Paul's Church on the square's west side. Moreover, Jones was then the King's Surveyor General, and must perforce have been involved in the overall design of the project.

For this reason, Brome chose to concentrate on Jones when crafting his satire on the greed of real-estate development and speculation. Brome, a longtime follower of Ben Jonson, must also have been influenced by the fact that Jonson's long-running battle of egos with Jones, in their unhappy partnership as masque makers for the Stuart Court, had come to a head in 1631 with Jones's victory and Jonson's defeat. Brome focuses his satire on two figures, Rookbill the architect and Cockbrain the justice of the peace; both represent Inigo Jones, who at the time also served as a justice of the peace for Westminster and Middlesex.

== Place realism ==
Brome was not the only playwright of his day to be attracted to this subject; Thomas Nabbes wrote his own Covent Garden, which was acted in 1633 and printed in 1638. Plays exploiting "place realism," connections with real London landmarks and institutions, were common in the early 1630s, with Shackerley Marmion's Holland's Leaguer (1631), James Shirley's Hyde Park (1632), and Nabbes's Tottenham Court (1634) being good examples. Other of Brome's plays also participate in this theatrical fashion.

== The play ==
The play is much more than a simple satire on a contemporary subject; its cast includes "a Puritan named Gabriel, a scarlet woman supposedly from Venice, various irate fathers and disguised lovers, and a group of hooligans known as 'The Brothers of the Blade,' whose expulsion gives the play its title." In shaping this confection, Brome presents a closely observed slice of contemporaneous London life in a realistic setting. The play has attracted critical comment for directing its satire both at fashionable society and at Puritans, and for the unusual scene of two prostitutes fighting each other with swords (Act IV, scene i). Some critics have complained of the play's "looseness of structure," even asserting that it "has no main plot."

== Sources ==
- Corns, Thomas N. A History of Seventeenth-Century English Literature. London, Blackwell, 2006.
- Leapman, Michael. Inigo: The Troubled Life of Inigo Jones, Architect of the English Renaissance. London, Headline Book Publishing, 2003.
- Schelling, Felix Emmanuel. Elizabethan Drama 1558–1642. 2 Volumes, Boston, Houghton Mifflin, 1908.
- Steggle, Matthew. Richard Brome: Place and Politics on the Caroline Stage. Manchester, Manchester University Press, 2004.
