= 1601 in literature =

List of years in literature	(table)
- … 1591; 1592; 1593; 1594; 1595; 1596; 1597; 1598; 1599; 1600; 1601; 1602; 1603; 1604; 1605; 1606; 1607; 1608; 1609; 1610; 1611 …
- Art; Archaeology; Architecture; Literature; Music; Philosophy; Science; +...

This article contains information about the literary events and publications of 1601.

== Events ==
- January 1 – The "Paul's Boys", a children's drama group, perform at the English royal court.
- January 6 – The Children of the Chapel give their first theatrical performance at the English court since 1584: Liberality and Prodigality, by an unknown dramatist.
- January 21 – Tirso de Molina enters the monastery of San Antolín at Guadalajara, Spain.
- February 7 – The Lord Chamberlain's Men stage a performance of Shakespeare's Richard II at the Globe Theatre in London. The performance is specially commissioned (at a 40-shilling bonus) by the plotters in the Earl of Essex's rebellion of the following day. The plotters hope that the play, depicting the overthrow of a reigning monarch, will influence the public mood in their favour. The plot fails.
- February 17 – Actor Augustine Phillips, a member of the Lord Chamberlain's Men, is deposed by the Privy Council of England.
- Spring – Probable latest date for first performance of Shakespeare's Hamlet. The play is presented by the Lord Chamberlain's Men at the Globe Theatre in London with Richard Burbage playing Prince Hamlet and (according to theatrical tradition) the dramatist playing the Ghost.
- May 31 – The authorities demand proof of the insanity of Tommaso Campanella, imprisoned in Italy for revolutionary plotting; Campanella is eventually judged insane and spared the death penalty and sentenced to life imprisonment, in the course of which he writes The City of the Sun.
- June (approximate) – Ben Jonson's The Poetaster is performed on stage for the first time.
- July – Lancelot Andrewes becomes Dean of Westminster.
- unknown dates
  - Thomas Overbury meets Robert Carr, 1st Earl of Somerset, and they become firm friends.
  - Philemon Holland publishes his translation of the Natural History of Pliny the Elder. When he composes Othello in the next year or so, Shakespeare exploits the book for references, including the "Anthropophagi" and the "Pontic Sea."

== New books ==
=== Prose ===
- Nicolas Barnaud – De Occulta philosophia
- Carolus Clusius – Rariarum plantarum historia
- Antonio de Herrera y Tordesillas – Historia general de los hechos de los Castellanos, volume 1
- Nicholas Hill – Philosophia epicurea
- Philemon Holland – The Historie of the World, a translation of Pliny's Natural History
- Thomas Middleton – The Penniless Parliament of Threadbare Poets
- Mavro Orbin – The Realm of the Slavs
- Achilles Tatius – The Adventures of Leucippe and Cleitophon (first printed edition of original Greek text, published Heidelberg)
- Brás Viegas – Commentarii exegetici in Apocalypsim

=== Drama ===
- Anonymous
  - The Return from Parnassus
  - (Sebastian Westcote?) – The Contention Between Liberality and Prodigality
- Thomas Dekker
  - Satiromastix
  - Blurt, Master Constable, or The Spaniards Night-Walke (with Thomas Middleton?)
- Ben Jonson
  - The Poetaster performed
  - Cynthia's Revels published
- John Lyly – Love's Metamorphosis published
- John Marston – What You Will
- Anthony Munday – The Downfall and The Death of Robert Earl of Huntington published together
- William Percy
  - Arabia sitiens, or, A Dreame of a Drye Yeare: a Tragaecomodye also known as Mahomet and His Heaven
  - Chaunge is no Robberye or The Bearing down of the Inne: A Comaedye
- William Shakespeare
  - Twelfth Night, or What You Will
  - Hamlet possible first performance
- Robert Yarington – Two Lamentable Tragedies published

=== Poetry ===
- Robert Chester – Love's Martyr. The volume also contains fourteen poems by other hands, including:
  - William Shakespeare – The Phoenix and the Turtle
- Gervase Markham – Mary Magdalene's Tears
- John Weever – The Mirror of Martyrs, or The Life and Death of Sir John Oldcastle
- Bento Teixeira – Prosopopeia

== Births ==
- January 8 – Baltasar Gracián, Spanish Jesuit writer (died 1658)
- March 7 – Johann Michael Moscherosch, German satirist (died 1669)
- June 5 – John Trapp, English Biblical commentator (died 1669)
- July 17 – Emmanuel Maignan, French theologian (died 1676)
- August 22 – Georges de Scudéry, French novelist, dramatist and poet (died 1667)
- Probable year of birth – François Tristan l'Hermite, French dramatist (died 1655)

== Deaths ==
- January 11 – Scipione Ammirato, Italian historian (born 1531)
- March 13 – Henry Cuffe, English philosophical writer and politician (executed, born 1563)
- April 10 – Mark Alexander Boyd, Scottish poet (born 1562)
- August 19 – William Lambarde, English antiquary and lawyer (born 1536)
- August 31 – Gian Vincenzo Pinelli, Italian humanist and book collector (born 1535)
- September 7 – John Shakespeare, English glover and father of William Shakespeare (born c. 1530)
- November 8 – John Hooker, English constitutionalist (born c. 1527)
- Approximate year of death – Thomas Nashe, English pamphleteer, poet and satirist (born 1567)
