= -mastix =

English language suffix

-mastix is a suffix derived from Ancient Greek, and used quite frequently in English literature of the 17th century, to denote a strong opponent or hater of whatever the suffix was attached to. It became common after Thomas Dekker's play Satiromastix of 1602. The word μάστιξ (mastix) translates as whip or scourge.

A well-known example is the 1632 book Histriomastix by William Prynne, against theatre, which caused legal proceedings against him because of perceived allusion to Queen Henrietta Maria. The title itself was not novel, and occurred in a late Elizabethan play Histrio-Mastix, subtitle The Player Whipped, by John Marston. Scholars have noted that the -mastix suffix is associated with Marston.

In a paper war of 1604–7 between Andrew Willet and Richard Parkes, part of the Descensus controversy, the formation of terms with -mastix as suffix was discussed, Willet having initially addressed Parkes in a pamphlet Limbo-mastix. Parkes affected to be unimpressed with the play on limbo, and Willet coined Loidoromastix for him, a "scourge for a railer". By 1623 and the Latin play Fucus Histriomastix the formation of hybrid words, Dog Latin and literary nonsense with the suffix seems to have been established. The term had apparently become generic for satire by the 1660s, when schoolboys wrote "a mastix" against the schoolmaster Thomas Grantham.

== Other forms ==
The Greek genitive form mastigos gives rise to a botanical prefix mastigo-; the suffix -mastix or -mastyx also occurs in botanical use for the whip form, for example in Uromastix. The plural form of the suffix is -mastiges, for example "Francomastiges" from "Francomastix", a term used by Guillaume Budé.

== Classical Latin and Greek ==
To form the title Histrio-mastix, Marston innovated by drawing on the nickname Homeromastix (Scourge of Homer) given to the Greek critic of Homer, Zoilus of Amphipolis. Bednarz notes that the reputation of Zoilus was as a hyper-critical commentator, and that Marston appears to have accepted the note of excess in his self-identification as Theriomastix. The story of Zoilus is referenced by Ovid in his Remedium Amoris.

Two Latin writers took -mastix names to indicate that they were harsh critics in the tradition of Zoilus, Carvilius Pictor ("Aeneidomastix", from The Aeneid of Virgil), and Largus Licinius as "Ciceromastix" from the author Cicero. Grammaticomastix is a Latin poem by Ausonius, a writer of the Late Antique, who adopted the style from Carvilius.

== Examples from Early Modern Latin literature ==
- Bezamastix, from Theodore Beza
- Capniomastix, scourge of Capnio, i.e., Johann Reuchlin, applied to Johannes Pfefferkorn
- Erasmomastix, from Desiderius Erasmus
- Hebraeomastix by Jerome of Santa Fe
- Heluetiomastix, scourge of the Swiss
- Huttenomastix, scourge of Ulrich von Hutten
- stauromastix, scourge of the Cross

== English satire revival of the 1590s ==
Three noted English poets were writing satirical verse by the later 1590s: John Donne, Joseph Hall, and John Marston. Donne used a -mastix construction, "female-mastix", to refer to Baptista Mantuanus (Mantuan), reputedly a misogynist based on his fourth eclogue, in his Elegy XIV. Hall's Virgidemiarum Six Bookes of 1597–8 contains a boast that he was the first English satirist; virgidemia translates from Latin as a "harvest of rods". The revival of satire lasted until the Bishops' Ban of 1599, in which the ecclesiastical authorities clamped down, with book burning applied to works of Everard Guilpin, Marston, William Rankins and others.

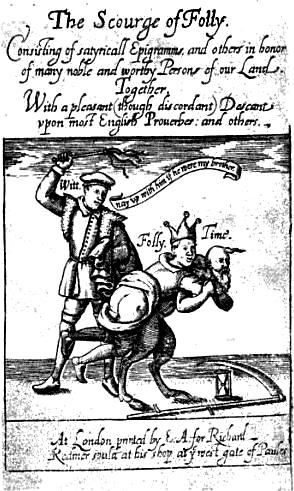
The Scourge of Folly, 1610 title page of a work by John Davies of Hereford

== Marston and Histrio-mastix ==
The years following the Bishops' Ban saw the War of the Theatres, as satire took to the stage. The cluster of plays The Scourge of Villanie (John Marston, pseudonym taken "Theriomastix", i.e. scourge of the beast), Histrio-Mastix, Satiromastix, and Every Man out of His Humour by Ben Jonson (which references Histrio-Mastix), has also been associated with the bookseller Thomas Thorpe.

The literary convention that the satirist could wield a whip against "vice" was active at the period in other titles, such as The Whippinge of the Satyre (1601) by John Weever, against the excesses of satire, an anonymous work taken to be aimed at Marston and Jonson, among others. Nicholas Breton's No Whippinge, nor Trippinge: but a kinde friendly Snippinge was a reply of the same year, from another of the presumed targets of Weever.

== Usage ==
The Oxford English Dictionary notes that most cases of -mastix compounds are nonce words. Its earliest example, for English, is musomastix, of the late 16th century; in Latin polemics of that period these formations were common. Besides expressing the idea of a hostile opponent, book titles were formed "in which an idea, person, or class of persons is satirized or denounced".

== Examples from English literature ==
Other uses are:

- Papisto mastix, or, The Protestants Religion Defended (1606), by William Middleton
- Atheomastix; clearing foure truthes, against atheists and infidels (1622), by Martin Fotherby
- Zoilomastix, short title for Vindiciae Hibernicae contra Giraldum Cambrensem et alios vel Zoilomastigos (1622) by Philip O'Sullivan Beare. O'Sullivan wrote also a Tenebriomastix, and an Archicornigeromastix against James Ussher.
- Profanomastix (1639), anti-Puritan work by John Swan
- Antibrownistus Puritanomastix, pseudonym under which three royalist speeches of 1642 were published.
- Aerio Mastix, or a Vindication of the Apostolicall and generally received Government of the Church of Christ by Bishops, Oxford, 1643, by John Theyer
- Chiliasto-mastix; or, The prophecies in the Old and New Testament (1644), by Alexander Petrie
- Mercurio-Coelico mastix (1644), by Sir George Wharton, 1st Baronet
- Astrologo-Mastix (1646) by John Geree
- Hagiomastix, or, The Scourge of the Saints (1647), by John Goodwin and anonymous reply Moro-mastix: Mr Iohn Goodwin whipt with his own rod (1647)
- Pseudo-mastix (c. 1650, printed 1888) by Michael Lemprière
- Smectymnuo-mastix, or Short Animadversions upon Smectymnuus (1651), by Hamon L'Estrange
- Alazono-Mastix; Or, the Character of a Cockney in a Satyricall Poem (1651), by Junius Anonymus; see Alazon for the reference to an imposter. This poem on London apprentices was discussed in the Retrospective Review. It is not connected with the pseudonym "Alazonomastix Philalethes" used at the same period by Henry More in controversy with Thomas Vaughan ("Eugenius Philalethes").
- Mercurius Mastix (1652), attributed to Samuel Sheppard
- Histrio-mastix. A Whip for Webster (1654), against John Webster, and Chiliastomastix redivivus: ... a Confutation of the Millenarian Opinion (1657), against Nathaniel Holmes, by Thomas Hall
- Virtuoso-mastix, applied in 1671 by Joseph Glanvill to Henry Stubbe.
- Rogero Mastix, a Rod for William Rogers (1685), by Thomas Ellwood
- Tolando-pseudologo-mastix, an Answer to Toland's "Hypatia" (anon.), 1721, by John King
- Zoilomastix, or, A Vindication of Milton from All the Invidious Charges of Mr William Lauder (1747) by Richard Richardson, against the forger William Lauder
- Medico-mastix (anon.), 1771, by Ralph Schomberg
- Sæculo-Mastix, or the Lash of the Age we live In (1818) by Francis Hodgson, verse containing criticism of the poetry of Lord Byron, and praise for Alexander Pope
- Hiero-Mastix, a satire (1828), prompted by the Apocrypha controversy
- "Scriblero-mastix" (1846), a coinage of Christopher North
