= John Waterson =

English publisher and bookseller (died 1656)

John Waterson (died 10 February 1656) was a London publisher and bookseller of the Jacobean and Caroline eras; he published significant works in English Renaissance drama, including plays by William Shakespeare, John Fletcher, John Webster, and Philip Massinger.

== Beginning ==
Waterson was the scion of a family of publishers: his grandfather Richard and his father Simon were both in the book trade. Simon Waterson (1585–1634) was also the brother-in-law of William Ponsonby, the prominent publisher of Edmund Spenser and Sir Philip Sidney; when Ponsonby died in 1604, Simon acquired many of Ponsonby's copyrights.

John Waterson became a "freeman" (a full member) of the Stationers Company on 27 June 1620, and soon after was an active independent publisher. He took over the management of his father's shop, at the sign of the Crown at Cheap Gate in St. Paul's Churchyard. (Simon Waterson is thought to have gone into semi-retirement when his son took over, though his name appeared on published books until his death.) The younger Waterson continued to publish some of his father's works; Simon Waterson issued the first four editions of William Camden's Remains of a Greater Work Concerning Britain (1605, 1614, 1623, 1629), and John printed the fifth and sixth editions (1636, 1637). Simon published the first edition of an anonymous English translation of Guarini's Il Pastor Fido (1602), and John published the second edition (1633).

One of John Waterson's earliest publications was also one of his most notable: the first quarto of Webster's The Duchess of Malfi (1623), printed by Nicholas Okes.

== Maturity ==
John Waterson also published a noteworthy and problematic entry in the Shakespeare canon: The Two Noble Kinsmen (1634), printed by Thomas Cotes. The title page of the quarto attributes the play to Shakespeare and Fletcher, an attribution that inspired three centuries of controversy before its general acceptance in the modern era.

Other first editions of plays published by Waterson include:

- Sir William Davenant's The Cruel Brother (1630), printed by Augustine Matthews;
- Davenant's The Just Italian (also 1630), printed by Thomas Harper;
- Philip Massinger's The Renegado (also 1630), printed by Matthews;
- Massinger's The Emperor of the East (1632), printed by Harper;
- Fletcher and Massinger's The Elder Brother (1637), in partnership with John Benson, printed by Felix Kingston;
- Fletcher's Monsieur Thomas (1639), printed by Harper;
- Massinger's The Unnatural Combat (1639), printed by "E.G."

(Waterson maintained a close professional relationship with printer Thomas Harper; they worked together on many projects, including the Camden editions noted above.)

Waterson also had a connection with Ben Jonson; he entered Jonson's play The Staple of News into the Stationers' Register on 14 April 1626. For unknown reasons, the play was not published at that time, and Waterson transferred his copyright to Robert Allot on 7 September 1631.

Waterson published works beyond the confines of drama; he issued poetry, with volumes that included:

- Michael Drayton's The Muses' Elysium (1630), printed by Harper;
- Samuel Daniel's The Whole Works in Poetry (1635), printed by Thomas Cotes.

And Waterson produced the normal range of miscellaneous books typical of stationers in his era, including religious works like Anthony Stafford's The Female Glory, or the Life and Death of the Holy Virgin Mary (1635), and popular fiction like The Tragedy of Alceste and Eliza (1638) — both printed by Harper.

== End ==
Waterson apparently retired from business after 1641. In October 1646 he transferred his copyrights to The Two Noble Kinsmen, The Elder Brother, and Monsieur Thomas to Humphrey Moseley. The shop at the sign of the Crown passed to stationer John Williams; John Waterson's son, another Simon Waterson, served his apprenticeship under Williams in the 1640s. This younger Simon Waterson was active in the book trade in the middle 1650s, doing business at the sign of the Globe in Paul's Churchyard.
