= Sam Shepard (disambiguation) =

Sam Shepard (1943–2017) was an American actor and playwright

Samuel or Sam Shepard or Sheppard may also refer to:

- Samuel Sheppard (writer) (c. 1624–c. 1655), English author and poet
- Sam Sheppard (1923–1970), American physician who inspired The Fugitive
- Samuel Shephard (1987–), recipient of the George Cross
- Sam Shephard, candidate in the 1990 Ontario general election
- Sam Shepard, a character in the novel Overkill

== See also ==
- Sam Shepherd (disambiguation)
