= Andrew Wise =

Elizabethan-era London publisher

Andrew Wise (fl. 1589 – c. 1603), or Wyse or Wythes, was an English publisher in London during the Elizabethan era who issued first editions of five Shakespearean plays.

== Life ==
Wise was the son of a Yorkshire yeoman; as "Wythes," he was bound for an eight-year apprenticeship to Henry Smith on Lady Day (25 March) 1580, and put over to Thomas Bradshaw of Cambridge 3 Apr 1581. He became a "freeman" (a full member) of the Stationers' Company on 26 May 1589. Wise ran his own business in London from about 1593 to 1603; his shop was at the sign of the Angel in St Paul's Churchyard.

== Publications ==
Wise's many publications include:

- Thomas Nashe's Christ's Tears Over Jerusalem (1593)
- Thomas Playfair's The Pathway to Perfection and The Mean of Mourning (both 1596) and
- Thomas Campion's Observations in the Art of English Poesy (1602)

Wise published editions of the following five Shakespearean plays:

- He entered Richard II into the Stationers' Register on 20 August 1597, and published the first quarto of the play before the end of the year. The second and third quartos both followed in 1598. All three volumes were printed by Valentine Simmes.
- Richard III was entered into the Stationers' Register on 20 October 1597; the first quarto appeared later that year. Wise published the second quarto of R3 in 1598, and the third in 1602. Valentine Simmes printed signatures A-G of the first quarto, with H-M coming from Peter Short's print shop. The other two books were printed by Thomas Creede.
- Henry IV, Part 1 was registered on 25 February 1598 (new style), and published later that year, printed by Valentine Simmes and Peter Short. Q2 followed in 1599, with printing by Simon Stafford.
- Henry IV, Part 2 was registered on 23 August 1600; the sole quarto edition of the era was published that same year. In this case, Wise worked in partnership with colleague William Aspley; the printing was done once again by Valentine Simmes.
- Much Ado About Nothing was also registered on 23 August 1600, and published that year by Wise and Aspley, with printing by Simmes.

According to Peter W. M. Blayney, "Andrew Wise...struck gold three times in a row in 1597–8 by picking what would become the three best-selling Shakespearean quartos as the first three plays of his brief career." According to Sonia Massai, "No other London stationer invested in Shakespeare as assiduously as Wise did, at least while Shakespeare was still alive."

Wise published a range of other contemporary works, apart from the Shakespearian plays. As was typical of publishers of his era, he put out religious and homiletic works, although he appears to have operated a rather small-scale business, in comparison with other stationers of his generation.

On 25 June 1603, Wise transferred his entries at Stationers Hall to R2, R3, and 1H4 to fellow stationer Matthew Law, who issued subsequent quartos of all three plays. Thereafter Wise "is not heard of again."
