= William Ostler =

16th/17th-century English actor

William Ostler (died 16 December 1614) was an actor in English Renaissance theatre, a member of the King's Men, the company of William Shakespeare.

Ostler started out as a boy player in the Children of the Chapel troupe; he was cast in their 1601 production of Ben Jonson's The Poetaster, with Nathan Field and John Underwood, two other future King's Men. Ostler, like Underwood, joined the King's Men most likely in 1608 or soon after. Ostler was cast in their 1610 production of Jonson's The Alchemist, as well as subsequent productions of Bonduca, The Captain, and Valentinian. He played Antonio in Webster's The Duchess of Malfi. He was praised for the quality of his acting, once being called "the Roscius of these times" (John Davies, Scourge of Folly, 1610). Ostler also became a shareholder, or "householder" (i.e. a part-owner) in both of the King's Men's theatres, the Blackfriars (20 May 1611) and the Globe (20 February 1612).

In 1611 Ostler married Thomasine Heminges, the daughter of fellow King's Man John Heminges; their son Beaumont Ostler was born in 1612 (baptized on 18 May). In 1614, however, Ostler died without leaving a will. By common law, his property should have passed to his wife; but John Heminges seized control of his deceased son-in-law's Globe and Blackfriars shares. Thomasine sued her father to recover her property; the outcome of the suit cannot be determined with certainty from the surviving records, but John Heminges appears to have been able to retain control of the shares.
