= Jack Drum's Entertainment =

Play written by John Marston

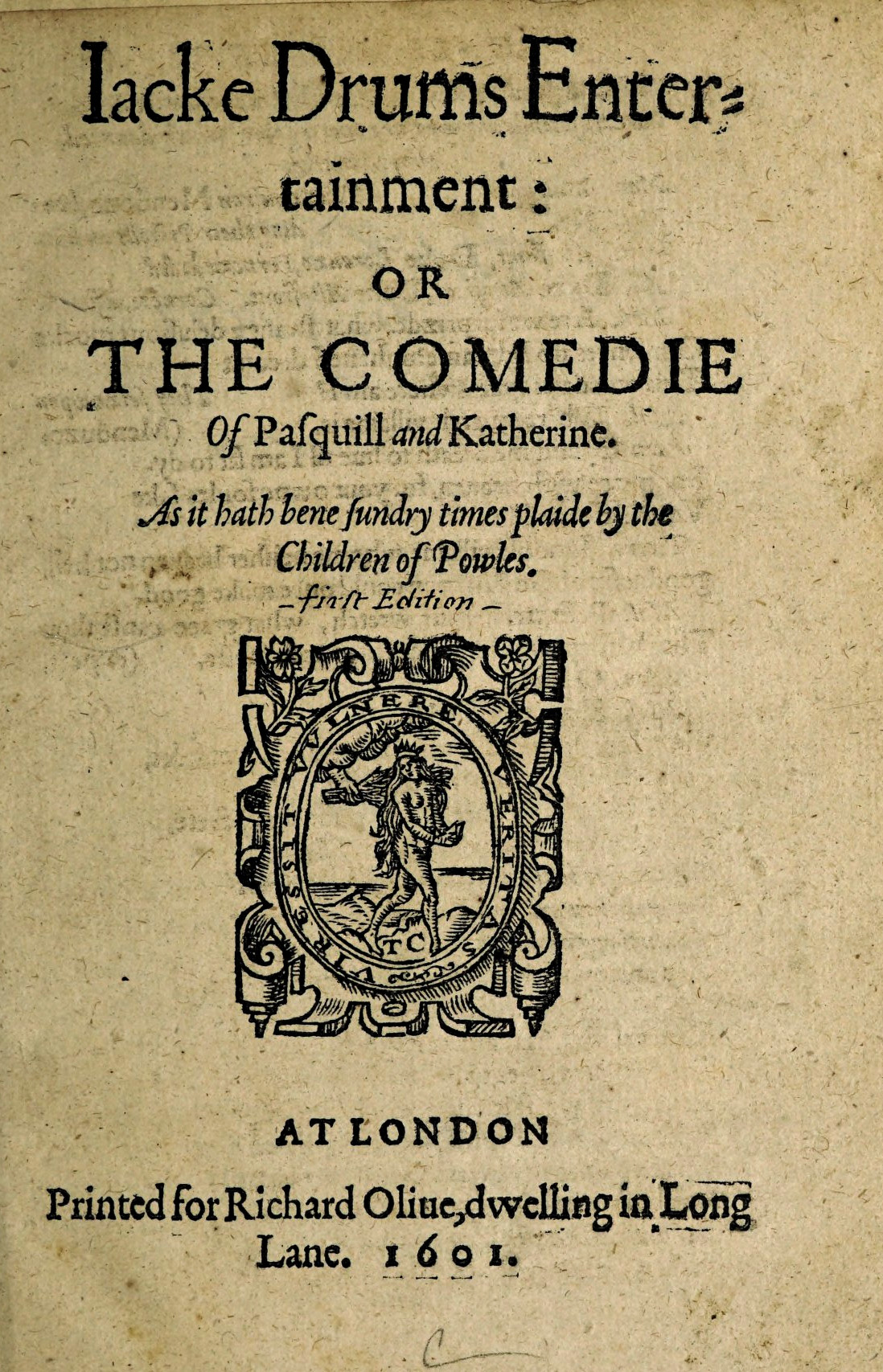
Title page of the first edition of Iacke Drums Entertainment (1601)

Jack Drum's Entertainment, or the Comedy of Pasquil and Katherine is a late Elizabethan play written by the dramatist and satirist John Marston in 1600. It was first performed by the Children of Paul's, one of the troupes of boy actors popular in that era.

The play can be dated to 1600 on internal evidence, including a reference to William Kempe's famous morris dance from Norwich to London in the early spring of that year. It was entered into the Stationers' Register by the bookseller Felix Norton on 8 September 1600. On 23 October the rights were transferred to Richard Olive (i.e., Oliff), and the first edition was printed for Oliff in 1601. A second edition, issued by Philip Knight, appeared in 1616, and was reprinted in 1618 by Nathaniel Fosbrooke. All three quartos are anonymous, but the play has long been attributed to Marston on stylistic grounds, and his authorship is explicitly confirmed by extracts quoted in the commonplace book of Edward Pudsey (1573–1613).

The play tells the story of the love between Pasquil and Katherine and the trials that they face on the way to happiness. It is based loosely on the story of Argalus and Parthenia in Sir Philip Sidney's Arcadia, which also provided material for the subplot concerning the love of Camelia and Planet. It satirizes both human folly in general and the madness of being in love, although its harshest criticism is reserved for those who cannot feel love, like the wicked usurer Mamon, or those who believe themselves superior, failing to recognize that all men may be foolish at times, like the self-satisfied critic Brabant Senior.

The play has been described as a "hodgepodge of undeveloped romantic, comic, and satiric motifs" and "a strange mixture of genres" including elements of mediaeval romance, satire, and later Jacobean city comedies. Some have emphasized its fundamentally romantic nature, while others have seen it as a satire of romantic comedy and "gallant" manners, or more specifically as a burlesque of the roughly contemporary play The Tryall of Chevalry, which drew on the same episodes from Sidney's Arcadia that provided the subject matter for Jack Drum's Entertainment. Many scholars, reading the play in the context of the so-called War of the Theatres, which pitted Ben Jonson against John Marston and Thomas Dekker, have assumed that the character of Brabant Senior was meant as a satirical portrait of Jonson, although others have rejected this interpretation. Similarly, the character of Sir Edward Fortune has occasionally been seen as an allusion to the actor Edward Alleyn, who was building the Fortune Theatre in 1600, or as a caricature of Sir William Cornwallis (died 1611), a courtier known for his free spending and lavish entertainments.

The title Jack Drum's Entertainment is derived from an Elizabethan and Jacobean colloquial expression for rough or ill-mannered treatment, especially of an unwanted guest.
