= The Unnatural Combat =

Play written by Philip Massinger

The Unnatural Combat is a Jacobean era stage play, a tragedy written by Philip Massinger, and first published in 1639.

== History ==
No hard data on the play's date of origin or initial theatrical production has survived. Scholars estimate a date in the early 1620s; "There is a strong case for a late 1624 or early 1625 date for the play." The play was entered into the Stationers' Register on 14 February 1639, and published in quarto later that year by the bookseller John Waterson; the title page states that it was acted by the King's Men in the Globe Theatre. The quarto also bears Massinger's dedication of the play to a personal friend, Sir Anthony St. Leger (or "Sentleger").

In search of a source for Massinger's plot, critics have considered the story of Beatrice Cenci and a passage in Jonson's Catiline that refers to "incest, murders, rapes...incestuous life." Yet it is clear from the thinness of these connections that the plot of the play is "Massinger's own."

Scholars have studied The Unnatural Combat for resonances with the events of its era; it has been argued that the play's portrait of its villain Malefort Senior alludes to the sex scandals and witchcraft allegations surrounding George Villiers, 1st Duke of Buckingham. Also, in another possible anti-Buckingham thrust, the play may refer to the failed English expedition to Cádiz (1625); the dedicatee's brother, Sir William St. Leger, was instrumental in the expedition and was critical of Buckingham's conduct of it.

The play's theme of incest has prevented it from gaining any status as a popular or often-revived drama. Nineteenth-century critics tended to condemn The Unnatural Combat for its sensational aspect; but T. S. Eliot praised the play's "deft handling of suspense" and its "theatrical skill."

== Synopsis ==
The play tells the story of the intertwined fates of two families, the Beauforts and Maleforts. Beaufort Senior is the governor of Marseilles in France; his son, Beaufort Junior, is in love with, and beloved by, Theocrine, the daughter of Malefort Senior, the admiral of Marseilles. The admiral's son and Theocrine's half-brother, Malefort Junior, is a successful and notorious pirate; at the start of the play his pirate fleet is blockading the harbor of the city, and his father the admiral is suspected of collusion with the son's actions.

This situation is delineated in the play's opening scene, which proceeds to the admiral's trial before the governor and other officials. Malefort Senior reminds his judges of his many past victories and acts of courage, though to little effect. The trial is then interrupted by an emissary from the pirates, who bears a challenge: Malefort Junior challenges his father to single combat, which will decide the outcome of the pirates' siege. Malefort Senior agrees; it is a way for him to clear his reputation and refute the charges against him—but more than that, the challenge satisfies his bloody-minded nature. (This duel, of course, is the "unnatural combat" of the title.)

Malefort Junior and his captains arrive for the duel. The pirates, talking among themselves, express their surprise at their leader's course of action; they do not comprehend his motives. When Malefort Senior and Junior meet, they converse before the fight – and the son reproaches his father for having committed a "deed of horror" (though he doesn't specify the nature of that horrible action). They duel; the father kills the son, and mutilates his body. The pirates withdraw, according to their agreement; Malefort Senior is cleared of the charges against him and hailed once more as the city's hero.

Plans are made for the wedding of Beaufort Junior and Theocrine; but their friends note the strange, doting, almost obsessive behavior that Malefort Senior has begun to show toward his daughter. A plan is hatched to distract the admiral at a banquet in his honor, and to take Theocrine aside for a quick marriage ceremony with her fiancé. But Malefort Senior is too suspicious and watchful to be fooled in this way, and he discovers and forestalls the intended ceremony. In a soliloquy, Malefort divulges that he is suddenly plagued with, and almost overcome by, lustful and incestuous desire for his daughter. In his confusion and distress, he appeals to his cynical friend Montreville, the commander of the city's fortress. Malefort asks Montreville to take Theocrine into his custody, and has the man swear to keep them, father and daughter, separate, no matter how Malefort may change his mind, object, or plead to the contrary in the future.

Montreville does as Malefort requests, but for his own dark motives; he abducts Theocrine and takes her to his fortress. When Malefort eventually, and inevitably, comes to the fortress to try to get her back, Montreville has her tossed out the front gate, her clothing disordered and hair disheveled; and Montreville cheerfully admits to having raped her. He reminds Malefort that he was once a rejected suitor for Theocrine's hand, and gloats over his revenge. Montreville also reveals the sinister history the two men share, and the nature of the crime with which Malefort Junior had reproached his father on the "field of honor." Years before, Malefort had fallen in love with Montreville's mistress; to marry the woman, Malefort poisoned his first wife, his son's mother. Malefort then married the mistress, who gave birth to Theocrine.

Theocrine dies from the shock of her rape. Malefort, in his distraction, sees the ghosts of his son and his murdered first wife. A thunderstorm rises, and Malefort is struck by a bolt of lightning and killed on the spot. The forces of the governor, led by Beaufort Senior and Junior and other officials, assault and take the fortress; Montreville is led away to answer for his crime.

The tragic plot is varied with some elements of comic relief, from two sources. One is a group of Theocrine's servants that includes her Usher, waiting women, and especially her Page; the other, and the more important one, is the figure of Belgarde, a cashiered captain who has to struggle for survival, cadging free meals wherever he can. Belgarde also supplies social commentary on the fates of soldiers and sailors who are no longer needed by society (relevant, perhaps, in the aftermath of the Cadiz campaign).

== Sources ==
- Edwards, Philip, and Colin Gibson, eds. The Plays and Poems of Philip Massinger. London, Oxford University Press, 1976.
- Eliot, T. S. The Sacred Wood and Major Early Essays. Mineola, NY, Courier Dover, 1998.
- Kinney, Arthur F., and Dan S. Collins, eds. Renaissance Historicism. Amherst, MA, University of Massachusetts Press, 1987.
- Logan, Terence P., and Denzell S. Smith, eds. The Later Jacobean and Caroline Dramatists: A Survey and Bibliography of Recent Studies in English Renaissance Drama. Lincoln, NE, University of Nebraska Press, 1978.
- Mulryne, James Ronald, and Margaret Shewring, eds. Theatre and Government Under the Early Stuarts. Cambridge, Cambridge University Press, 1993.
- Samson, Alexander, ed. The Spanish Match: Prince Charles's Journey to Madrid, 1623. London, Ashgate, 2006.
