= 1600 in literature =

This article presents lists of the literary events and publications in 1600.

== Events ==
- January 1 – The Admiral's Men perform Dekker's The Shoemaker's Holiday at the English Court.
- January 8 – Carpenter Peter Street is contracted to build the Fortune Playhouse just north of the City of London by theatrical manager Philip Henslowe and his stepson-in-law, the leading actor Edward Alleyn, for the Admiral's Men, who move there from The Rose by the end of the year.
- March 6 – George Carey, Lord Hunsdon, the Lord Chamberlain of England, entertains the Flemish ambassador Ludowic Verreyken at Hunsdon House in the Blackfriars district of London. The entertainment includes a performance of Shakespeare's Henry IV, Part 1 by the Lord Chamberlain's Men.
- March 10 – Philip Henslowe lends William Haughton ten shillings "to release him out of the Clink".
- c. April – Publication of Ben Jonson's 1599 play Every Man out of His Humour; it goes through three editions this year.
- April 18 – Hortensio Félix Paravicino joins the Trinitarian Order.
- June 3 – Thomas Pavier becomes a publisher in the City of London, securing the rights to the plays Captain Thomas Stukeley, Sir John Oldcastle, Kyd's The Spanish Tragedy and Shakespeare's Henry V.
- June 4 – The last performances of the Chester miracle plays take place.
- By August – Robert Armin succeeds Will Kempe as clown of the Lord Chamberlain's Men at the Globe Theatre in London. By September, Kempe is playing with Worcester's Men at The Rose (theatre).
- September – Richard Burbage leases the disused Blackfriars Theatre in London to Henry Evans and Nathaniel Giles for £40 per year. Evans and Giles use the space for the performances of the Children of the Chapel. Giles drafts Solomon Pavy, age ten, into his acting troupe.
- September 8 – John Marston's Jack Drum's Entertainment is entered in the Stationers' Register. It is being acted by the newly re-formed Children of Paul's. The character of Brabant Senior represents Ben Jonson, thus continuing London's War of the Theatres. Jonson responds with Cynthia's Revels, acted by the Children of the Chapel at the Blackfriars Theatre (and over Christmas at Court, but without success there).
- October 18 – Juan Ruiz de Alarcón begins his legal studies at the University of Salamanca.
- November 4 – Tirso de Molina joins the Order of the Blessed Virgin Mary of Mercy.
- By end – The Admiral's Men are playing at Edward Alleyn and Philip Henslowe's new Fortune Playhouse just north of the City of London.
- Biblioteca Riccardiana established in Florence.

== New books ==
=== Prose ===
- Robert Armin (as "Clonnico de Curtanio Snuffe") – Fool Upon Fool
- William Camden (anonymously) – Reges, reginae, nobiles et alii in ecclesia collegiata B. Petri Westmonasterii sepulti (tombs and epitaph of Westminster Abbey)
- Fabritio Caroso – Nobiltà de dame
- Olivier de Serres – Théâtre d'agriculture
- Lope de Vega – Romancero general
- William Gilbert and Aaron Dowling – De Magnete, Magneticisque Corporibus, et de Magno Magnete Tellure
- Philemon Holland – The Romane Historie (translation of Livy's Ab Urbe Condita)
- Aonio Paleario (executed 1570) – Actio in pontifices romanos et eorum asseclas
- Samuel Rowlands – The Letting of Humour's Blood in the Head-vaine with A Mery Meetinge, or tis Mery when Knaves mete

=== Drama ===
- Anonymous
  - Look About You (published)
  - The Maid's Metamorphosis
  - Sir John Oldcastle (published)
  - The Weakest Goeth to the Wall (published)
  - The Wisdom of Doctor Dodypoll
- Henry Chettle & John Day – The Blind Beggar of Bethnal Green, Part 1 (Parts 2 and 3, by Day and William Haughton, lost)
- Georgios Chortatzis – Erofili (approximate year)
- Lope de Vega – year of some approximate
  - La campana de Aragón
  - El castigo del discreto
  - La imperial de Otón
  - El postrer godo de España
  - La quinta de Florencia
  - Roma abrasada
  - La viuda valenciana (The Widow from Valencia)
- Thomas Dekker – Old Fortunatus (published)
- Thomas Dekker and others (probable) – Lust's Dominion (approximate date)
- Thomas Dekker, John Marston, and William Haughton – The Spanish Moor's Tragedy (possibly same as Lust's Dominion)
- Thomas Heywood – Edward IV, Parts 1 and 2 published
- Thomas Heywood (attrib.) and others? – Edward IV (published)
- Ben Jonson – Cynthia's Revels
- John Marston – Jack Drum's Entertainment
- Thomas Nashe – Summer's Last Will and Testament (published)
- William Shakespeare – Henry IV, Part 2, The Merchant of Venice, Henry V, A Midsummer Night's Dream, and Much Ado About Nothing (published)

=== Poetry ===
- Siddha Basavaraja – Bedagina Vachanagalu (anthology)
- England's Helicon (anthology including work by Edmund Spenser, Michael Drayton, Thomas Lodge, Philip Sidney etc.)
- Robert Jones – The First Book of Songs and Airs
- Gervase Markham – The Tears of the Beloved
- Thomas Middleton – The Ghost of Lucrece

== Births ==
- January 1 – Friedrich Spanheim, Flemish writer (died 1649)
- January 17 – Pedro Calderón de la Barca, Spanish dramatist (died 1681)
- February 2 – Gabriel Naudé, French librarian and scholar (died 1653)
- September 19 – Hermann Busenbaum, German Jesuit theologian (died 1668)
- October 5 – Thomas Goodwin, English theologian (died 1680)
- November – John Ogilby, Scottish translator (died 1676)
- November 19 – Leo Aitzema, Dutch historian (died 1669)
- Unknown dates
  - Martin de Barcos, French Jansenist theologian (died 1678)
  - Marin le Roy de Gomberville, French poet and novelist (died 1674)
  - William Prynne, English Puritan controversialist (died 1669)
  - Adriaan Vlacq, Dutch publisher (died 1667)
  - Brian Walton, Bishop of Chester, English compiler of Polyglot Bible and bishop (died 1661)
- Probable year of birth
  - Piaras Feiritéar, Irish poet (hanged 1653)
  - Richard Flecknoe, English dramatist and poet (died 1678)
  - Samuel Hartlib, German-born English polymath (died 1662)

== Deaths ==
- January 23 – John Case, English commentator on Aristotle
- February 15 – José de Acosta, Spanish naturalist (born 1539)
- April – Thomas Deloney, English novelist and balladist (born 1543)
- May 18 – Fulvio Orsini, Italian historian (born 1529)
- June 25 – David Chytraeus, German theologian and historian (born 1530)
- September 25 – Antoine du Verdier, French politician and writer (born 1544)
- October 12 – Luis de Molina, Spanish Jesuit writer (born 1535)
- November – Robert Wilson, English dramatist (date of birth unknown)
- November 2 – Richard Hooker, English theologian (born 1554)
- November 23 or 24 – Balthasar Russow, Estonian chronicler (born 1536)
- Unknown dates
  - Bâkî (Mahmud Abdülbâkî), Ottoman Turkish poet (born 1526)
  - Mustafa Selaniki, Ottoman chronicler (date of birth unknown)
