= Samuel Shepheard =

Samuel Shepheard may refer to:

- Samuel Shepheard (died 1719), Member of Parliament for Newport (Isle of Wight) and the City of London
- Samuel Shepheard (died 1748), his son, Member of Parliament for Malmesbury, Cambridge and Cambridgeshire

== See also ==
- Samuel Shepherd (disambiguation)
