= Bento Teixeira =

Portuguese poet

- Born: 1561; Porto, Kingdom of Portugal
- Died: 1618 (aged 56–57); Lisbon, Kingdom of Portugal
- Occupations: Poet, teacher
- Spouse: Filipa Raposa
- Writing career
- Notable work: Prosopopeia
- Movement: Baroque

Bento Teixeira (1561? – 1618?) was a Portuguese poet. He is considered to be the introducer of Baroque in the Portuguese province of Brazil.

== Life ==
Details about Teixeira's life are very sparse. His birthplace is most commonly accepted to be Porto, Portugal, to Manuel Álvares de Barros and Lianor Rodrigues. Teixeira moved to the colony of Brazil in 1567(?), first living in Bahia, but he had to flee to Pernambuco when he was accused of being a Jew.

In Pernambuco, Bento Teixeira became a teacher of Arithmetics, Grammar and Latin. Returning to Bahia, he married Filipa Raposa in the city of Ilhéus, in 1584(?).

Allegedly, Teixeira murdered his wife when he suspected her of adultery, which prompted him to flee to Pernambuco once more. Having taken refuge at the Monastery of São Bento, he wrote his masterpiece Prosopopeia.

Another version states that Teixeira's wife accused him of being Jewish. After being interrogated and absolved in 1589, he was intimated by the caller of the Portuguese Inquisition, and Teixeira then confessed that he was a follower of Judaism. Enraged by his wife's delation, he murdered her and fled to the aforementioned monastery. However, he was found, arrested and sent to Lisbon in 1595(?), staying there until his death.

== Works ==
Many works were attributed to Teixeira, such as:

- Relações do Naufrágio: According to studies made by Francisco Adolfo de Varnhagen, it was written by Afonso Luís, pilot of a carrack named Santo António, mentioned in the poem Prosopopeia.
- Diálogos das Grandezas do Brasil: According to Capistrano de Abreu, it was written by Ambrósio Fernandes Brandão.

The only one whose authorship is confirmed was the epic poem Prosopopeia, written in 1601. The poem, inspired by Luís de Camões' Os Lusíadas, tells about the life and works of the then-governor of Pernambuco Jorge de Albuquerque Coelho and his brother Duarte.
