= Sam Shepherd =

Sam Shepherd may refer to:

- Samuel Shepherd, British barrister
- Sam Shepherd (Groveland Four), American man killed by Sheriff Willis V. McCall
- Sam Shepherd (basketball), Venezuelan basketball player
- Floating Points, the recording and performing moniker of electronic musician Sam Shepherd

== See also ==
- Sam Shepard (disambiguation)
- Sam Sheppard, American physician involved in a famous murder trial
- Samuel Shepheard (disambiguation)
