= Thomas Creede =

English printer (d 1617)

Thomas Creede (fl. 1593 – 1617) was a printer of the Elizabethan and Jacobean eras, rated as "one of the best of his time." Based in London, he conducted his business under the sign of the Catherine Wheel in Thames Street from 1593 to 1600, and under the sign of the Eagle and Child in the Old Exchange from 1600 to 1617. Creede is best known for printing editions of works in English Renaissance drama, especially for ten editions of six Shakespearean plays and three works in the Shakespeare Apocrypha.

== Printing ==
In Creede's era, the disciplines of printing and publishing were generally conducted separately. Books were published by stationers or booksellers, who subcontracted the job of printing to professional printers. Those individuals, like William Jaggard of First Folio fame, who regularly functioned as both publishers and printers, were the exceptions to the general rule. Much of Creede's most noteworthy work, as with Shakespearean texts, followed this model – he worked as a printer hired by booksellers; yet Creede did a not-insignificant amount of publishing too (see below).

For the bookseller Thomas Millington, Creede printed:

- Henry VI, Part 2, Q1, 1594 (Note: This was the early alternative text of Shakespeare's play, short-titled The First Part of the Contention Betwixt the Two Famous Houses of York and Lancaster. Scholars have disputed the exact relationship between The First Part of the Contention and the 2 Henry VI of the First Folio; many consider the early version a "bad quarto" of Shakespeare's original. Millington had Q2 of The Contention printed by Valentine Simmes in 1600.)

For Andrew Wise, Creede printed:

- Richard III, Q2, 1598
- Richard III, Q3, 1602

For Matthew Law (who acquired the rights to Richard III from Wise in 1603), Creede printed:

- Richard III, Q4, 1605
- Richard III, Q5, 1612

For Cuthbert Burby, Creede printed:

- Romeo and Juliet, 1599 (the "good" quarto, as opposed to the "bad" Q1 of 1597)

For Thomas Millington and John Busby, Creede printed:

- Henry V, Q1, 1600 (a "bad quarto")

For Thomas Pavier (who acquired the rights to Henry V later in 1600), Creede printed:

- Henry V, Q2, 1602 (another "bad quarto")

For Arthur Johnson, Creede printed:

- The Merry Wives of Windsor, Q1 1602 (yet another "bad quarto")

For Henry Gosson, Creede, along with fellow printer William White, printed:

- Pericles, Prince of Tyre, Q1, 1609

For Nathaniel Butter, Creede printed the sole quarto of:

- The London Prodigal, Q, 1605, one of the plays of the Shakespeare Apocrypha; assigned on the title page to "William Shakespeare"

And for Arthur Johnson, Creede printed:

- The Merry Devil of Edmonton, Q2, 1612; another Apocryphal play.

Creede was responsible for a number of play texts beyond the confines of Shakespeariana. He printed the sole quartos of the anonymous plays The Maid's Metamorphosis and The Wisdom of Doctor Dodypoll, both for Richard Olive, in 1600; he printed the first quartos of George Chapman's Monsieur D'Olive for William Holmes (1606), and Beaumont and Fletcher's Cupid's Revenge and Wentworth Smith's Hector of Germany, both for Josias Harrison (both 1615), and the second quarto of John Lyly's Mother Bombie for Cuthbert Burby (1598). For Richard Hawkins, Creede printed The Tragedy of Mariam (1613) by Elizabeth Tanfield Cary, the first original tragedy by a woman author published in English.

And for Richard Olive, Creede printed one of the more significant non-dramatic texts of English Renaissance drama, the 1592 pamphlet by Robert Greene known as Greene's Groats-Worth of Wit, which contains the earliest citation of Shakespeare in a theatrical context yet discovered. For Thomas Bushell, Creede printed the Microcynicon of Thomas Middleton (1599), which was suppressed by the Archbishop of Canterbury.

Inevitably, Creede also worked on many non-dramatic projects, some of serious merit; in 1597 he printed the fifth edition of Spenser's The Shepherd's Calendar for John Harrison the Younger. Equally inevitably, he printed works of ephemeral interest, now forgotten. For Thomas Woodcocke, for instance, Creede printed John Dickenson's Arisbas: Euphues Amidst His Slumbers, or Cupid's Journey to Hell in 1594. Creede printed many of the prose romances of chivalry that were immensely popular in his era. Working in another instance for Richard Olive, he printed Emanuel Ford's Parismus, the Renowned Prince of Bohemia (1598). It must have been a success: nine years later Creede would both print and publish another of Ford's novels, The Most Pleasant History of Ornatus and Artesia (1607). For Cuthbert Burby, Creede printed the eighth volume of perhaps the most popular novel of the period, The Mirror of Knighthood (1599).

== Publishing ==
In some cases Creede functioned as a publisher as well as a printer, like Valentine Simmes and some others. Notably, he issued ten plays in quarto editions during an early phase of his career:

- A Looking Glass for London and England, Q1, 1594; Q2, 1598 (entered into the Stationers' Register on 5 March 1594)
- Selimus, 1594 (no Register entry)
- The Pedlar's Prophecy, 1595 (registered 13 May 1594)
- The Famous Victories of Henry V, 1598 (registered 14 May 1594)
- The Scottish History of James IV, 1598 (also registered 14 May 1594)
- Menaechmi, 1595 (registered 10 June 1594)
- The True Tragedy of Richard III, 1594 (Stationers' Register, 19 June 1594)
- Locrine, 1595 (registered 20 July 1594)
- Alphonsus King of Aragon, 1599 (no Register entry)
- Sir Clyomon and Sir Clamydes, 1599 (no Register entry).

Locrine is another work of the Shakespeare Apocrypha, while the anonymous Famous Victories of Henry V is generally regarded as a source for Shakespeare's play. Several plays on the list were published one or more years after registration; the reasons for the delays are unknown, though business considerations are an obvious possible answer. Creede's title pages for The Pedlar's Prophecy, The True Tragedy of Richard III, and A Looking Glass, Q1 and Q2, specify that the books would be sold by the stationer William Barley. (Creede printed a third quarto of A Looking Glass in 1602, though for this Q3 he was only the printer; Thomas Pavier was the publisher.)

It can be noted that when he acted as a publisher, Creede made no attributions of authorship that are certainly false.

He attributed James IV to Robert Greene, and A Looking Glass for London to Greene and Thomas Lodge, both of which are correct; he stated that William Warner's translation of the Menaechmi of Plautus was "written in English by W. W." And he credited Greene's Alphonsus to "R. G." Five plays were published with no attributions of authorship. When Creede stated, on the title page of Locrine, that the play had been revised by someone with the initials "W. S.," this record of reliability suggests that it may well have been so.

Creede also published works beyond the confines of drama. He issued books of verse, including reprints of Virgil, and works on spiritual subjects, like The Plain Man's Spiritual Plow by "I. C." (1607). Creede published the third edition of Ralph Robinson's English translation of Sir Thomas More's Utopia (1597) – and The True Law of Free Monarchies by King James I (1603). Prose works by playwrights of the era, including Middleton, Greene, and Thomas Dekker, issued from his press; Dekker's The Wonderful Year 1603, his account of the bubonic plague epidemic, is a noteworthy example. And Creede published, as well as printed, ephemera, like Lewis Lavaterus's Of Ghosts and Spirits (1596).

== Reputation ==
While Creede's skill as a printer, compared to others of his age, is widely recognized, his connection with Shakespearean bad quartos and Apocryphal plays has led scholars and critics to question his ethics. The records of the Stationers' Company show that in the summer of 1595, Creede was fined twice (sixpence, and five shillings) for violating the rules of the company. Far more seriously, Creede was prosecuted in the London consistory court in 1608 for "fornication and bastardy." The married Creede was accused of seducing a 25-year-old servant woman named Suzan More, and fathering an illegitimate child that died soon after birth.

In 1616, Creede entered into a business partnership with Bernard Alsop, who took over the business in 1617, after Creede's death or retirement. (In 1617 Alsop issued Q4 of A Looking Glass and Q2 of The Famous Victories, with no mention of Creede.)
