= Monsieur Thomas =

Stage play by John Fletcher

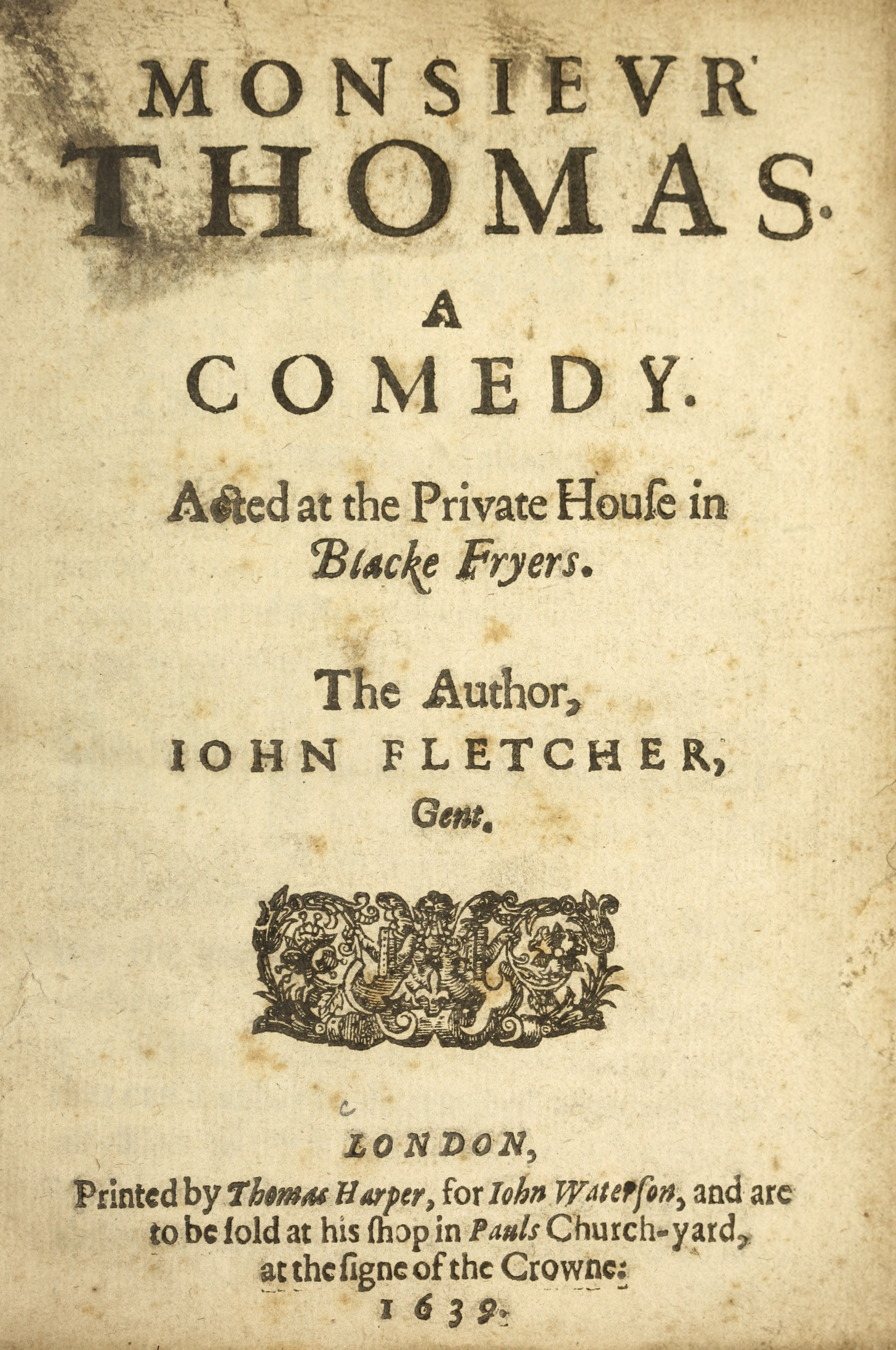
Title page of the first edition of Monsieur Thomas (1639)

Monsieur Thomas is a Jacobean era stage play, a comedy written by John Fletcher that was first published in 1639.

== Date and Source ==
Scholars date the play to the 1610–16 period. Fletcher's source for the play's plot was the second part of the novel Astrée by Honoré d'Urfé, which was first published in 1610. It is true that, like many other literary works of the era, Astrée circulated in manuscript form prior to its appearance in print; William Drummond of Hawthornden read Part 1 of the novel in manuscript in February 1607, and it is possible that Fletcher similarly saw Part 2 before 1610. Yet there is no direct evidence of this; and the simplest hypothesis is that Fletcher used the 1610 printed text of Astrée, Part 2 as his source. (Fletcher also used D'Urfé's novel as a source for his The Mad Lover and Valentinian, other plays of the same era.) Monsieur Thomas was "probably written by 1616."

== Publication ==
The play was entered into the Stationers' Register on 22 January 1639, and published later that year in a quarto printed by Thomas Harper for the bookseller John Waterson. The 1639 quarto bears a commendatory poem written by Richard Brome, and an Epistle to Fletcher's admirer Charles Cotton, also signed by Brome. The title page of the quarto states that the play was acted at the Blackfriars Theatre, without mentioning the company involved. Both the Register entry and the quarto assign the play's authorship to Fletcher alone, a verdict that is confirmed by the internal evidence of the text.

A second quarto, from the stationer Robert Crofts, is undated but is thought to have appeared c. 1661.

Like other previously-printed Fletcher plays, Monsieur Thomas was omitted from the first Beaumont and Fletcher folio of 1647, but was included in the second folio of 1679. The play's plot resembles that of another Fletcher play, Wit Without Money; the two dramas share some characters' names (Francisco, Valentine, and Launce).

== Revision ==
Though no sign of a second author or collaborator is present, the play does display the types of internal discontinuity that suggest revision – in this case, Fletcher's revision of his own earlier work. In the play's final scene, a character is addressed as "Francisco, now no more young Callidon" – which makes no sense, since the character in question has been identified as "Frank" throughout the play. The nickname "Wild-oats" is applied to two different characters in two separate scenes; the Dorothea of the first three Acts becomes Dorothy in the final two; other similar problems occur. This suggests that an earlier version of the play existed, in which Francisco was called Callidon, as in D'Urfé's novel. (See Women Pleased for another instance of Fletcher revising his earlier work.)

The hypothesis of revision is supported by other external evidence. The King's Men revived Monsieur Thomas early in the Restoration era; Samuel Pepys saw it on 28 September 1661. The revival probably inspired the drama's re-publication in a Croft's second quarto. In Q2, the play is titled Father's Own Son. A play by this title was in possession of the Cockpit Theatre in 1639. The total implication of these facts is the existence of two versions of the same Fletcher play. Fletcher appears to have written Father's Own Son, perhaps for the Children of the Queen's Revels, c. 1610, or the Lady Elizabeth's Men a few years later; and that play descended to Beeston's Boys at the Cockpit Theatre three decades later, as various early plays did. Fletcher later produced a revised version of his play titled Monsieur Thomas, likely for the King's Men.

== Adaptations ==
Material from Monsieur Thomas was transformed into a droll during the period of the English Civil War and the Interregnum (1642–60) when the London theatres were officially closed for full-length plays. The droll was called The Doctors of Dull-Head College, and was printed in the second volume of Francis Kirkman's collection The Wits (1673). And like many plays in Fletcher's canon, Monsieur Thomas was adapted into a new form in the Restoration; Thomas D'Urfey produced an edited and simplified version called Trick for Trick, or The Debauch'd Hypocrite (1678), with a new beginning and ending. Charles Hart played the title role in D'Urfey's version.

== Synopsis ==
The play's main plot, borrowed from the French novel, tells a tale of a romantic conflict between two men for one woman. The characters Thamyre, Calydon, and Celidée of Astrée become Fletcher's Valentine, Francisco, and Cellide.

The opening scene introduces Valentine, a middle-aged man who has just returned home from foreign travels. He is somewhat anxious to see if his much younger fiancée, Cellide, has waited for him, and is relieved to learn that she is faithful. Valentine has brought home with him a young man he met on his travels, named Francisco; he feels an unusually strong bond for the young man, a strangely intense affection. (The opening scene's conversations also reveal that Valentine is a widower who, years before, had lost a child "at sea / Among the Genoa gallies.")

Francisco barely arrives at Valentine's home when he falls ill. (The play contains some satire on doctors and their treatments; it was this material that was abstracted to form the droll described above.) It soon becomes clear that Francisco's sickness is largely lovesickness: he had fallen in love with Cellide. When Valentine realizes this, he magnanimously resigns his interest in Cellide and consigns her to the younger man – though Cellide is not very pleased at being handed off in this way. The three characters enter into a tangle of complex emotions over their predicament: Valentine is torn between his affections for Cellide and for Francisco; Francisco is caught between his passion for Cellide, his friendship for Valentine, and his innate nobility of character. In the end, the problem is resolved by the revelation that Francisco is Valentine's long-lost son – which explains the older man's irrational bond with the younger. Valentine is content to lose a fiancée to gain a son and a daughter-in-law.

The play, however, derives its title from the protagonist of its secondary plot. Charles Kingsley would later call Thomas "the spiritual father of all Angry lads, Rufflers, Blades, Bullies, Mohocks, Corinthians, and Dandies...." Thomas is a typical Jacobean wild young man, a scapegrace and a ne'er-do-well...but with a difference. Out of sheer willfulness and sport, he torments Mary, the woman who loves him, with outrageous behavior; she hopes he will abandon "his mad-cap follies." Yet toward his father, who is more than tolerant of young men sowing their wild oats, Thomas puts on a mask of sanctimony, merely to irritate and provoke. Mary eventually learns that she has to fight fire with fire, and submits Thomas to pranks and manipulations (including an instance of the "bed trick" famous from plays of the era) to teach him his lesson. Once his lesson has been learned, the reformed Thomas can make Mary a suitable husband.
