= William Middleton (pamphleteer) =

William Middleton (died 1613) was an English churchman, academic and Protestant controversialist. He was Master of Corpus Christi College, Cambridge for a brief period in 1603.

== Life ==
A native of Shropshire, Middleton matriculated as a sizar of Queens' College, Cambridge, in October 1567, proceeded B.A. in 1570–1, and was elected a fellow of his college 28 June 1572. The president and fellows in 1574 denied him permission to proceed to the degree of M.A. at Cambridge, and he consequently took that degree at Oxford. But his title to it was not recognised by his Cambridge colleagues, and he was deprived of his fellowship in July 1575, for not having commenced M.A. within the period prescribed by the college statutes. On appealing to Lord Burghley, chancellor of the university, he was restored to his fellowship, but not to his seniority. He was incorporated M.A. at Cambridge in 1576, proceeded B.D. in 1582, and vacated his fellowship in or about 1590.

From 1585 Middleton held the rectory of Hardwick, Cambridgeshire. He was elected master of Corpus Christi College, Cambridge, at the end of the reign of Elizabeth I, in place of Thomas Jegon, brother of John Jegon, of whom the queen disapproved. On the accession of James I, Jegon was restored; Middleton made a fruitless attempt to retain possession, but he had alienated the fellowship.

Middleton died on 14 June 1613, and was buried in Hardwick churchyard, where a monument, with an English inscription, was erected to his memory.

== Works ==
Middleton's only extant work, although he is said to have written others, is Papisto Mastix, or the Protestants Religion defended. Shewing briefeley when the great compound heresie of Poperie first sprange; how it grew peece by peece till Antichrist was disclosed; .... and when it shall be cut down and withered, London, 1606 (see -mastix.) It was dedicated to Dr. Humphrey Tendall, and to the fellows of Queens' College. The work has the secondary title: A Briefe Answere to a Popish Dialogue between two Gentlemen; the one a Papist, the other a Protestant. The work is a dialogue; the dialogue it answered is not extant.

== Notes ==
Attribution

This article incorporates text from a publication now in the public domain: Lee, Sidney, ed. (1894). "Middleton, William (d.1613)". Dictionary of National Biography. Vol. 37. London: Smith, Elder & Co.
