= Satiromastix =

Stage play by Thomas Dekker

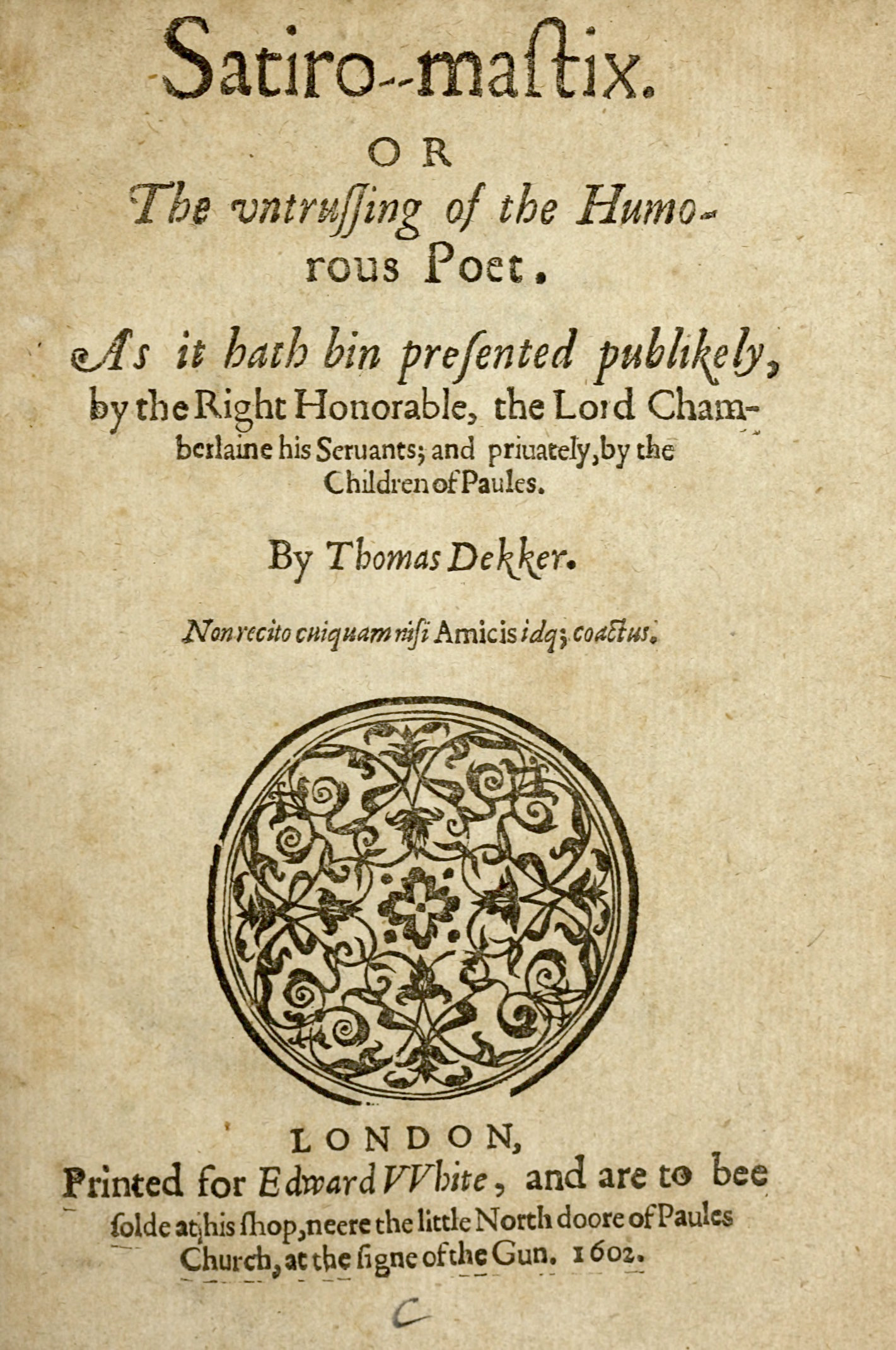
Title page of the first edition of Satiromastix (1602)

Satiromastix, or The Untrussing of the Humorous Poet is a late Elizabethan stage play by Thomas Dekker, one of the plays involved in the Poetomachia or War of the Theatres.

The play was entered into the Stationers' Register on 11 November 1601, and published in quarto in 1602, printed by Edward Allde for the bookseller Edward White. The title page of the quarto attributes authorship to Dekker, and states that the play was performed by both the Lord Chamberlain's Men and the Children of Paul's.

Scholars agree that the figure of Horace in Satiromastix represents Ben Jonson. As George Kirkpatrick Hunter argues,

"In Satiromastix, Horace (Jonson) is represented as a social hanger-on and toady, desperate to establish himself as an independent moralist but fearful of being held responsible for his judgments. We know his writing is corrupt, not because it is bad writing but because he himself is dishonest; his verse is concocted to exploit social possibilities, though he represents it as an essential part of a well-regulated state..."

Individual commentators have also tried to link other characters in the play with historical and literary figures of the era, though no consensus has been reached on any further identifications. It is thought that the play's satirical content was likely grafted onto a work already written, either in whole or in part; critics have noted that the tragic main plot and comic subplot of Satiromastix have little to do with the Poetomachia. Satiromastix is a response to Jonson's The Poetaster, which premiered in the spring of 1601; Dekker's play adopts the characters Crispinus, Demetrius, and Tucca from Jonson's. So the final writing and the performance of Dekker's play had to fit between spring and November of that year. It has been conjectured that John Marston may have made some contribution to Satiromastix, since he was Jonson's prime antagonist in the matter; but here again no firm consensus has been achieved.

== See also ==
- -mastix
