= Cynthia's Revels =

Play by Ben Jonson

Cynthia's Revels, or The Fountain of Self-Love is a late Elizabethan stage play, a satire written by Ben Jonson. The play was one element in the Poetomachia or War of the Theatres between Jonson and rival playwrights John Marston and Thomas Dekker.

== Performance ==
The play was first performed in 1600 at the Blackfriars Theatre by the Children of the Chapel, one of the troupes of boy actors active in that era. The Children acted the play at the English Royal Court during the 1600/01 Christmas season – though it was not a success with the audience there.

== Publication ==
The play was entered into the Stationers' Register on 23 May 1601, with the title Narcissus the Fountain of Self-Love. It was published in quarto later that year by the bookseller Walter Burre, under the title The Fountain of Self-Love, or Cynthia's Revels. The play next appeared in print when it was included in the first folio collection of Jonson's works in 1616. A prefatory note to the folio text identifies the principal actors in the cast of the original 1600 production: Nathan Field, John Underwood, Salathiel (or Salomon) Pavy, Robert Baxter, Thomas Day, and John Frost. Pavy played the role of Anaides.

There are significant differences between the Q and F texts of the play. Scenes IV, i and IV, iii are longer in F, and Act V is entirely new. Also, the character called Criticus in Q is named Crites (Greek for "judge") in F. It is thought that Jonson's original long play was cut down for performance by the boys.

== The Poetomachia ==
In Satiromastix, another play of the Poetomachia, Thomas Dekker accuses Jonson of having portrayed himself as Criticus, who is described as "a creature of almost perfect and divine temper" (Cynthia's Revels, II, iii). Some commentators have argued that Jonson was not quite so vain as to describe himself this way, and that, based on an allusion elsewhere in Jonson's works, Criticus may instead represent John Donne. Individual commentators have tried to identify other characters in the play with historical and literary figures of the era (Anaides, for example, being Marston – or Dekker), though a firm scholarly consensus on identifications has not evolved.

== Influence ==
In his 1912 edition of the play, editor A. C. Judson argued that Jonson modelled this play (for him, an atypically unrealistic work) on the plays of John Lyly, specifically Lyly's Galathea, Midas, Sapho and Phao, and Endymion. Among many resemblances and relationships, Jonson's pages in Cynthia, "Cupid, Morus, and the rest, are repetitions of Samias, Dares, and Epiton" in Endymion. Though Jonson refers to Lyly's plays as umbrae, plays long dead, Judson disputes the view of other critics that Jonson was satirising or ridiculing Lyly. An adapted "Ode to Cynthia" was used by Mike Oldfield in Incantations.

== Synopsis ==
The play begins with three pages disputing over the black cloak usually worn by the actor who delivers the prologue. They draw lots for the cloak, and one of the losers, Anaides, starts telling the audience what happens in the play to come; the others try to suppress him, interrupting him and putting their hands over his mouth. Soon they are fighting over the cloak and criticizing the author and the spectators as well.

In the play proper, the goddess Diana, also called Cynthia, has ordained a "solemn revels" in the valley of Gargaphie in Greece. The gods Cupid and Mercury appear, and they too start to argue. Mercury has awakened Echo, who weeps for Narcissus, and states that a drink from Narcissus's spring causes the drinkers to "Grow dotingly enamored of themselves." The courtiers and ladies assembled for the Cynthia's revels all drink from the spring.

Asotus, a foolish spendthrift who longs to become a courtier and a master of fashion and manners, also drinks from the spring; emboldened by vanity and self-love, he challenges all comers to a competition of "court compliment." The competition is held, in four phases, and the courtiers are beaten. Two symbolic masques are performed within the play for the assembled revelers. At their conclusion, Cynthia (representing Queen Elizabeth) has the dancers unmask and shows that vices have masqueraded as virtues. She sentences them to make reparation and to purify themselves by bathing in the spring at Mount Helicon.

The figure of Actaeon in the play may represent Robert Devereux, 2nd Earl of Essex, while Cynthia's lady in waiting Arete may be Lucy, Countess of Bedford, one of Elizabeth's ladies in waiting as well as Jonson's patroness.

The play is notably rich in music, as is typical for the theatre of the boys' companies, which originated as church choirs.

== Critical responses ==
Both as part of the Poetomachia and as a work by Jonson, Cynthia's Revels has received a good measure of attention from scholars and critics. The play, however, has not been judged as one of the playwright's successes. Critics have called the play "paralysed", "repugnant" and "stupefyingly dull." A more generous critic has classified Cynthia's Revels, along with Jonson's other early comedies, as learning exercises for the comic masterpieces that would follow, Volpone and The Alchemist. (And new approaches to the play have been essayed, as in Sarah Annes Brown's "Arachne's Web: Intertextual Mythography and The Renaissance Actaeon.")
