= Valentinian (play) =

Stage play by John Fletcher

Valentinian is a Jacobean stage play written by John Fletcher, a revenge tragedy based on the life of the Roman emperor Valentinian III (r. 425–455), and originally published in the first Beaumont and Fletcher folio of 1647. The play dramatizes the story of Valentinian, one of the last Roman emperors in the western Roman Empire and last ruler of the conjoined Valentinianic–Theodosian dynasty, as recorded by the Late Antique Greek historian Procopius. His assassin in the play is based on Petronius Maximus (r. 455), Valentinian's short-reigning successor.

== Date, source, performance ==
Scholars date the play to the 1610–14 period. As he did with Monsieur Thomas, another play of the same era, Fletcher used the second part of the novel L'Astrée by Honoré D'Urfé, as one of his sources; and Part 2 of Astrée was first published in 1610. The play was performed by the King's Men; the cast list added to the play in the second Beaumont and Fletcher folio of 1679 mentions Richard Burbage, Henry Condell, John Lowin, William Ostler, and John Underwood. Since Ostler died in December 1614, Valentinian must have been written and staged between those two dates.

== Plot ==
Fletcher portrays Valentinian as a lustful and rapacious tyrant, comparable to the King in The Maid's Tragedy. His empire is decadent and collapsing, his soldiers mutinous. Valentinian rapes the virtuous Lucina; she then commits suicide. Lucina's husband, the upright soldier Maximus, devotes himself to obtaining revenge against the emperor, though his friend Aecius tries to dissuade him. Maximus finally succeeds as Valentinian dies a painful and drawn-out death by poison. Maximus is crowned by the Roman Senate for overthrowing the tyrant, only to die himself soon after.

(The play was published with an epilogue suited to a comedy—an apparent print-shop blunder.)

== After 1660 ==
Like many plays in Fletcher's canon, Valentinian was both revived and adapted during the Restoration period. An adaptation under the same title by the poet and playwright John Wilmot, 2nd Earl of Rochester was staged in 1684 at Drury Lane and published in 1685. Rochester changed the play's order of scenes and eliminated the final act entirely, making Fletcher's heroine Lucina the central focus of the drama.

A setting by Robert Johnson of the song "Care charming sleep," the text of which is adapted from a sonnet by John Daniel, dates from about the time of the original production. The 1684 adaptation featured music composed by Louis Grabu.

== Critical responses ==
Critics generally do not place Fletcher's play in the first rank of the English Renaissance theatre's tragedies; the play has been criticized for "its disunity of plot, structural faults, and support of tyranny...." But the play has been considered influential on the Restoration tragedy that followed.

Modern critics have discussed the play's politics and sexual violence.
