= Zoilus =

Greek grammarian, philosopher and literary critic (c.400–320 BC)

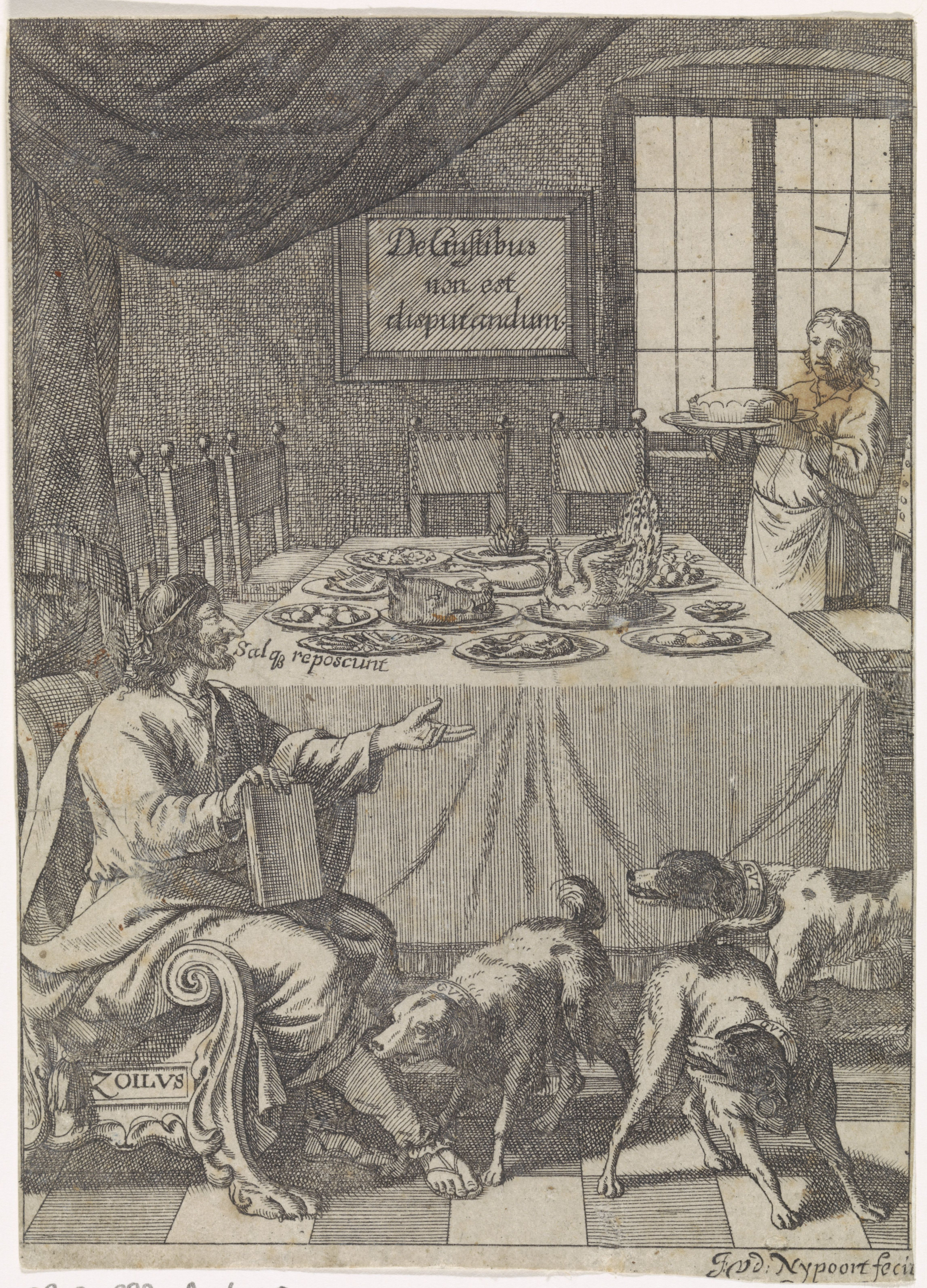
- Zoilus sitting at a table (by Justus van den Nypoort (Q25771500))
- Born: Amphipolis or Ephesus
- Died: Chios or Smyrna
- Other names: Zoilos, Zoïlus

Philosophical work
- Era: Ancient philosophy
- Region: Ancient Greek philosophy
- Notable ideas: Critique of Homer

Zoilus (Greek: Ζωΐλος Zoilos; c. 400 – 320 BC) was a Greek grammarian and literary critic from Amphipolis in Eastern Macedonia, then known as Thrace. He took the name Homeromastix (Ὁμηρομάστιξ "Homer whipper"; gen.: Ὁμηρομάστιγος) later in life.

== Biography ==
According to Vitruvius (vii., preface), Zoilus lived during the age of Ptolemy Philadelphus, by whom he was crucified as the punishment of his criticisms on the king; but this account should probably be rejected as a fiction based on Zoilus' reputation. Vitruvius goes on to state that Zoilus also may have been stoned at Chios or thrown alive upon a funeral pyre at Smyrna. Either way Vitruvius felt it was just as well since he deserved to be dead for slandering an author who could not defend himself. Zoilus appears to have been at one time a follower of Isocrates, but subsequently a pupil of Polycrates, whom he heard at Athens, where he was a teacher of rhetoric.

Zoilus was chiefly known for the acerbity of his attacks on Homer, chiefly directed against the fabulous element in the Homeric poems.

He authored several grammatical works, including Against the Poetry of Homer (9 speeches), a history spanning from the birth of the gods to the death of Philip of Macedon (3 books), On Amphipolis, Against the Rhetor Isocrates, and many other works, among them an invective against Homer. He also wrote responses to works by Isocrates and Plato, who had attacked the style of Lysias of which he approved.

However, the Homeric Question led to his name becoming a byword for harsh and malignant criticism: in antiquity he gained the name "Homeromastix", "scourge of Homer"; in the modern period, Cervantes calls Zoilus a "slanderer" in the preface to Don Quixote, and there is also a (now-disused) proverb, "Every poet has his Zoilus." Since his writings do not survive, it is impossible to know whether this caricature is justified.

As a result of his mockery of Homer, the people of Olympia chased him and threw him off the Scironian rocks (this passage from Suda might suffer from textual corruption, as the Scironian rocks were located between Megara and Corinth, far from Olympia).

== See also ==
- Zoilism
- -mastix
