= The Wisdom of Doctor Dodypoll =

The Wisdom of Doctor Dodypoll is a later Elizabethan stage play, an anonymous comedy first published in 1600. It is illustrative of the type of drama staged by the companies of child actors when they returned to public performance in that era.

== Date, performance, publication ==
The Wisdom of Doctor Dodypoll was entered into the Stationers' Register on 7 October 1600, and was published before the end of that year, in a quarto printed by Thomas Creede for the bookseller Richard Olive. This was the only edition of the play prior to the nineteenth century. The title page states the drama had been acted by the Children of Paul's, the troupe of boy actors that had resumed public dramatic performances in 1599 or 1600 after a decade's absence.

Various internal features in the play point to a date of authorship in the 1599–1600 interval. Like many plays of the children's companies, Doctor Dodypoll parodies the works of the established adult companies, including those of William Shakespeare. In Act III of Dodypoll occurs the line "Then reason's fled to animals I see," which parodies the famous "O judgment! thou art fled to brutish beasts, / And men have lost their reason" in Julius Caesar (c. 1599), Act III, scene ii, lines 104–5. (Ben Jonson parodies the same line, as "Reason long since is fled to animals, you know," in his 1599 play Every Man Out of His Humour, III, iv, 33.) The comic character Doctor Dodypoll, with his thick French accent, resembles Doctor Caius in The Merry Wives of Windsor (c. 1597–99); and Dodypoll also borrows from A Midsummer Night's Dream (c. 1595; printed 1600).

== Authorship ==
The matter of the play's date impinges on the question of its authorship. There is no external evidence for any specific author; the style of the play is reminiscent of the works of John Lyly and George Peele, and each has been suggested as the author of Dodypoll. "What thing is love?", a song used in Act I of Dodypoll is thought to derive from Peele's play The Hunting of Cupid. Yet Peele died in 1596, and Lyly had retired from playwriting in the early 1590s, making both of them problematic candidates for the authorship of Dodypoll. Ernest Gerrard proposed a complex scheme, in which Dodypoll was an old play by Lyly, written c. 1592, and then revised by Thomas Dekker and collaborators (perhaps Henry Chettle, John Day, and/or William Haughton) in 1599. Lack of supporting evidence has prevented most scholars from accepting such a genesis for the play.

Marshall Nyvall Matson, a modern editor of Dodypoll, argues that no convincing case for any given author, for revision, or for derivation from a previous source, has yet been made.

== Synopsis ==
In the Duchy of Saxony, the aristocrat Earl Lassingbergh masquerades as the humble painter Cornelius, to be near his love Lucilia. The opening scene shows the two of them together. Lassingbergh exalts her beauty as he paints; Lucilia modestly demurs. They are interrupted by the clown character Haunce, who is followed by Lucilia's elder sister Cornelia. Cornelia sings the song "What thing is Love?" while gazing at a cameo of the Saxon prince Alberdure. Cornelia in turn is followed by a merchant named Albertus and by Doctor Dodypoll. The two men are rival suitors for Cornelia's hand in marriage; each tries to court her, largely by insulting the other's occupation and extolling his own.

The jeweller Flores, the father of Cornelia and Lucilia, enters; in an aside, he reveals that he plans to marry Cornelia to Alberdure, the duchy's prince and heir, in order to raise his family "to our ancient states again" – his family derives from the nobility but has declined in fortune over time. Flores has obtained a love potion from Dodypoll, and orders Cornelia to administer it to Alberdure at a coming banquet. Cornelia disapproves, but agrees to comply. Alberdure loves Hyanthe, the daughter of Lord Cassimere; but the banquet arrives and Cornelia does as commanded. Dodypoll has miscalculated the dose of his potion, however; Alberdure reacts to an overdose with a fit of frenzy, complaining of "smoke and fire...Etna, sulphur...I burn, I burn...." He races from the banquet.

The nobles of the court, on visiting Flores, see the paintings of "Cornelius" and recognize the style of Earl Lassingbergh; and when they meet the artist they recognize the Earl. Flores is at first indignant at the Earl's masquerade, suspecting that Lassingbergh has seduced, or tried to seduce, his daughter. Lassingbergh protests that his intentions are honorable, and that he wants to marry Lucilia. Flores is mollified by this; but Lassingbergh is struck by a deep fit of melancholia at this slight to his honor. The wedding takes place, but Lassingbergh is unable to shake off his melancholy; he leaves his bride to wander off into the countryside, and she loyally follows him.

Alberdure is not alone in his infatuation with Hyanthe; the prince's father, Duke Alphonso, also wishes to marry her, even though he is contracted to the dowager Duchess of Brunswick. The Duke makes feeble excuses for delaying his planned marriage with the Duchess, claiming sinister portents and foreboding dreams. His attempt to court Hyanthe is disrupted by the mad Alberdure, who eventually escapes his would-be guardians and makes off into the countryside...so that he, and Lassingbergh and Lucilia, are discontentedly roaming about. The resemblance to A Midsummer Night's Dream is accentuated by the appearance of a troupe of fairies; they set out a banquet, and mistakenly give a precious bejewelled cup to a passing peasant. The Enchanter who controls the fairies appears, and reproves them for misplacing the cup; then he sees Lassingbergh and Lucilia, and has his fairies bind and abduct them. Confused by his spells, Lucilia forgets both herself and her husband; the Enchanter tries to convince her that he is her husband – but Lucilia's true love is too strong to be deceived by the trick.

The play depicts a series of comings and goings, meetings and partings and misunderstandings among Alberdure, his pursuers, Lassingbergh and Lucilia, and the peasant. Costumes are switched, and the fairies' cup and Alberdure's cameo portrait change hands. Alberdure falls into a cold stream; he is fished out by pursuers, but presumed drowned. The shock of the cold plunge cures his fit; he awakens alone, and returns to the court to be re-united with Hyanthe. A party from the court of Brunswick arrives, including the present Duke and the dowager Duchess (the widow of the Duke's late brother) who is betrothed to Duke Alphonso. They discover their nephew the Earl Lassingbergh sleeping in the woods, with Lucilia sitting, disconsolately but faithfully, nearby. Once they obtain her story, the Duke and Duchess bring her to the Saxon court with them. Lassingbergh awakens alone; though he has previously scorned and neglected his wife, he is now shocked to find her gone. Fearing for her safety, he sets off in search of her – and heads back to court himself.

The characters are now gathering for the final resolution – though it does not come about smoothly. Duke Alphonso expresses his remorse for his past actions and longs for his son's return – the type of repentance that often prefigures and motivates the denouement of an Elizabethan comedy. Yet when Alberdure is revealed to him, the Duke recants his repentance and insists that he will have Hyanthe for his wife. It is only when the visitors from Brunswick arrive that Alphonso, to save face, accepts the Duchess (who is reportedly even more beautiful than Hyanthe) as his bride, and permits the marriage of Alberdure and Hyanthe. Lassingbergh, now jolted out of his melancholy, is re-united with Lucilia. Doctor Dodypoll comes in for some final fooling and mockery at the play's end.

== Critical responses ==
Several aspects of the play have drawn special attention from scholars and critics. The portrayal of Earl Lassingbergh as an admirable and aristocratic painter is noteworthy, in a historical era in which artists had not yet fully shaken off their Medieval status as mere artisans or craftsmen. (Lucilia notes that the Earl has humbled his dignity by masquerading as a simple "mercenary painter.") The play's fairies and Enchanter have also drawn attention from critics interested in the occult aspects of English Renaissance theatre.

Individual scholars have proposed that two characters in the play were based on real people of the Elizabethan age. Abraham Feldman argued that the character Haunce was based on the artist Hans Ewouts. (While the stage Dutchman in Elizabethan drama is normally a drunkard and a contemptuous figure, Haunce is clever and speaks English well.) Hersch Zitt proposed that the Doctor Dodypoll character derives from Dr. Roderigo Lopez, the physician who was executed for treason in 1594 – even though Dodypoll is not Jewish, Lopez was not French, and there was nothing particularly funny about Lopez or his case.
