= The Widow from Valencia =

Play written by Lope de Vega

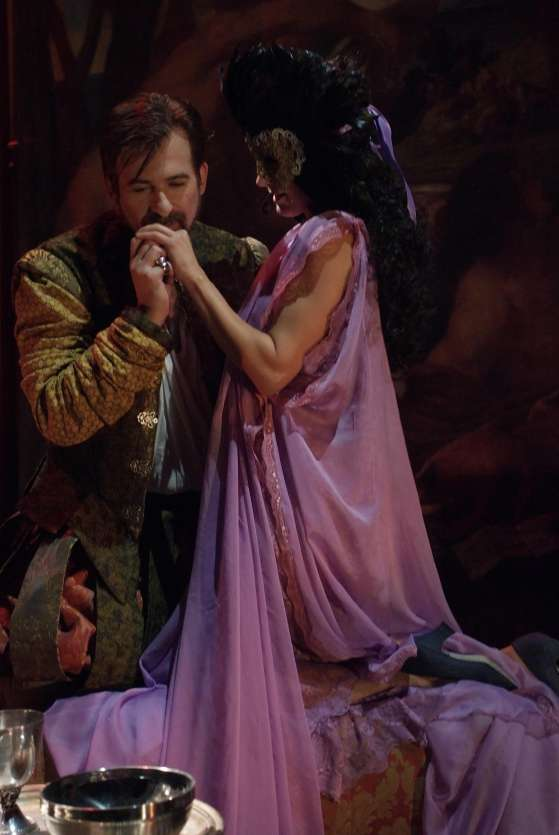
Alicia Ramírez and Juanjo Prats performing in The Widow from Valencia

The Widow from Valencia (Spanish: La viuda valenciana) is a play written by the Spanish playwright Lope de Vega, who is considered part of the Spanish Golden Age of literature. The play was written circa 1600 as a result of Lope's visit to the city with his new patron, the future Count of Lemos. They were there for the marriage of the King Philip III with Margaret of Austria. However, the play was not published until 1620 in the fifteenth part of his Comedias, where it is dedicated to Marcia Leonarda, that is to say, to Lope's beloved Marta de Nevares.

The Widow from Valencia is a cloak and sword play which follows the plot of the Invisible Mistress. This plot derives from the myth of Cupid and Psyche but inverts the role of the protagonists. In the plot, and in the Spanish play, it is the man's curiosity which leads him to meet and fall in love with the invisible woman; that is, with a woman who is either hidden, veiled or encountered in the dark. The Invisible Mistress plot is already found in Italian novelle by Masuccio and Bandello. As is common in the cloak and sword plays, it is the woman, in this case the widow Leonarda, who propels the action. Although at first she wishes to remain at home, mourning her dead husband, reading pious texts, and contemplating sacred images, one of them painted by Francisco Ribalta, she soon changes her mind on seeing a handsome young man. Her objective now becomes to enjoy herself by having a clandestine affair. She has her servants arrange a meeting with Camilo, where she is in darkness so that her lover will not know what she looks like or who she is, hence she becomes his invisible mistress. In this manner she hopes not to endanger her honor and reputation.

This play has been interpreted from many points of view. For some, it deals with honor but leads the spectator to become aware of the immorality of the action; for others the work hides a mythological mystery; while for others it is a way to provoke a response in character, audience and reader; A particularly interesting feature of this play is that three different suitors come to Leonarda's home disguised as merchants. One of them, Valerio, pretends to be a merchant of engravings of famous paintings, including Titian's Venus and Adonis. Otón, a second suitor disguised as merchant, is also of interest since he comes with books of love, such as the Miguel de Cervantes novel La Galatea.

== See also ==
- The Phantom Lady, a play by Pedro Calderón de la Barca with similar themes
