= Brás Viegas =

Portuguese Jesuit

Brás Viegas (Blasius de Viegas) (1553–1599) was a Portuguese Jesuit, known as a biblical commentator.

== Life ==
He was born in Évora, and entered the Society of Jesus in 1569. He became a teacher at Coimbra and the University of Évora, where he was granted a doctorate in 1594.

== Works ==
- Commentarii exegetici in Apocalypsim (1601)

The book became well known; in it Viegas expressed his expectation for spiritual renewal led by the Society of Jesus. There were later editions, edited by Odoardo Farnese. It was translated into Ge'ez by Jesuit missionaries.

- Meditações sobre os mysterios da paixam, resurreiçam, e acensaõ de Christo Nosso Senhor (1601)

By the Jesuit Vincenzo Bruno (1532–1594).
