= Robert Yarington =

Robert Yarington (fl. 1601), was an English playwright, most famous for his play, Two Tragedies in One, which has two concurrent plots. One of these tells of the murder and gruesome dismembering of Mr Beech, a chaundler in Thames Street, and his boy, by Thomas Merry, the other of a young child murdered in a wood by two ruffians, with the consent of his uncle. In the concurrent plot, set in Padua, Falleria witnesses the will of his dying brother Pandino (which bequeaths all his wealth to his son Pertillo), and in order to cheat his nephew of the inheritance has him murdered by two ruffians. Falleria is eventually undone by the dying testimony of one of the ruffians, and is sentenced to death by the Duke of Padua. In the 'London' plot, Merry is finally brought to justice by the 'accidental' testimony of his former servant Harry Williams. Merry and his innocent sister, Rachel, are hanged - but Williams is saved by pleading the ancient 'benefit of clergy', and is simply branded on the left hand.

They were printed for Matthew Law, and were sold at his shop in Paul's Churchyard near St. Augustines Gate at the sign of the Fox, 1601. Nothing has been discovered concerning Robert Yarington. In Henslow's Diary (ed. Collier, pp. 92–3) there is a record that William Haughton and John Day wrote a tragedy called ‘The Tragedy of Thomas Merry.’ This was clearly on the first subject of Yarington's play. The next entry in the Diary refers to ‘The Orphan's Tragedy’ by Henry Chettle, which was apparently never finished. This may be the second half of Yarington's play.

Frederick Gard Fleay conjectures that Yarington is a fictitious name, and that his play is an amalgamation of the two plays by Haughton, Day, and Chettle. A. H. Bullen republished the play with an introduction in ‘A Collection of Old English Plays.’
