= Anthony Stafford =

Anthony Stafford (1587–1645?) was an English Anglican devotional writer. He was in particular concerned for, and attacked over, the use of Marian devotions within the Church of England.

== Life ==
He was the fifth and youngest son of John Stafford of Blatherwycke, Northamptonshire, and his wife, Bridget Clopton. He matriculated as a gentleman commoner at Oriel College, Oxford, on 8 March 1605; in 1606 he entered the Inner Temple. A homosexual scandal hit his family in 1607, when his elder brother was executed for buggery, and he did not complete his education.

In 1609, "having then a design to publish certain matters", Stafford was permitted to study in the Bodleian Library. In 1622 he was in Antwerp, gathering intelligence for William Trumbull. He was on 18 July 1623 created M.A. at Oxford "as a person adorned with all kinds of literature". Thomas Randolph, also from Northamptonshire, wrote c.1633 an "Ode to master Anthony Stafford, to hasten him into the country"; and took service with William Stafford of Blatherwycke. It has been suggested that the poem was connected to a visit by Stafford to Berkeley Castle.

Stafford was engaged in a suit before the court of wards in 1641–2 against Lady Anne Farmer and Charles Stafford, from whom he claimed a rent-change and arrears. Anthony Wood claimed that he died during the English Civil War; he is known to have been living in 1645.

== Works ==
Stafford published theological and devotional treatises, some of which gave offence to Puritan feelings. His major work was The Femall Glory, modern spelling The Female Glory; or the Life and Death of the Virgin Mary of 1635, also known as "The Precedent of Female Perfection". It was licensed by William Laud. Henry Burton was censured by the Star Chamber for attacking it in a sermon For God and the King; Burton was answered by Peter Heylyn in Moderate Answer to Dr. Burton, and by Christopher Dow in Innovations unjustly charged. It was reprinted in 1860 as Life of the Blessed Virgin, editor Orby Shipley, with facsimiles of the original illustrations after Overbeck. In this edition was also printed for the first time The Apology of the Author from ye Aspersions cast uppon it by H. Burton, by Stafford, dedicated to Laud and William Juxon.

Other works by Stafford were:

- Stafford's Niobe, or his Age of Teares: a Treatise no less profitable and comfortable than the Times damnable. Wherein Death's Vizard is pulled off, described as of the contemptus mundi genre, with Stafford's Niobe dissolved into a Nilus, or his Age drowned in her own Teares … an admonition to a Discontented Romanist (1611). There is a dedication to Robert Cecil, 1st Earl of Salisbury. Another dedication, however, ended badly, when Lady Anne Clifford, 14th Baroness de Clifford objected to its wording; or the objection may have been from her husband, Richard Sackville, 3rd Earl of Dorset.
- Meditations and Resolutions, Moral, Divine, and Political (1612), with a translation of the Latin oration of Justus Lipsius against calumny.
- The Golden Meane (1613), anonymous, attributed.
- Stafford's Heavenly Dogge, or Life and Death of that Great Cynick Diogenes, whom Laertius stiles Caius Cælestis (1615). It was one of a cluster of works of the time, by William Goddard, John Melton and Samuel Rowlands in particular, praising Diogenes the Cynic and using the satirical comparison of his bluntness with courtiers.
- Guide of Honour; or the Ballance wherein she may weigh her actions (1634), undated and written abroad c.1621, dedicated to George Berkeley, 8th Baron Berkeley.
- A Synopsis or Compendium of the Fathers (1635), translation from the French of Daniel Tossanus.
- The Day of Salvation, or a Homily upon the Bloody Sacrifice of Christ (1635).
- A Wittie Encounter between Monsieur de Moulin and Monsieur de Balzac (1636), translation from the French.
- Honour and Virtue triumphing over the Grave, exemplified in a fair devout Life and Death, adorned with the surviving perfections of Henry, lord Stafford, lately deceased (1640), with elegies on the death of Henry Stafford, 5th Baron Stafford, mostly associated with St. John's College, Oxford.
- Life of the Blessed Virgin: Together With the Apology of the Author, Now First Printed, 1860 edition

== Notes ==
Attribution

This article incorporates text from a publication now in the public domain: Lee, Sidney, ed. (1898). "Stafford, Anthony". Dictionary of National Biography. Vol. 53. London: Smith, Elder & Co.
