= Poetaster (play) =

Play written by Ben Jonson

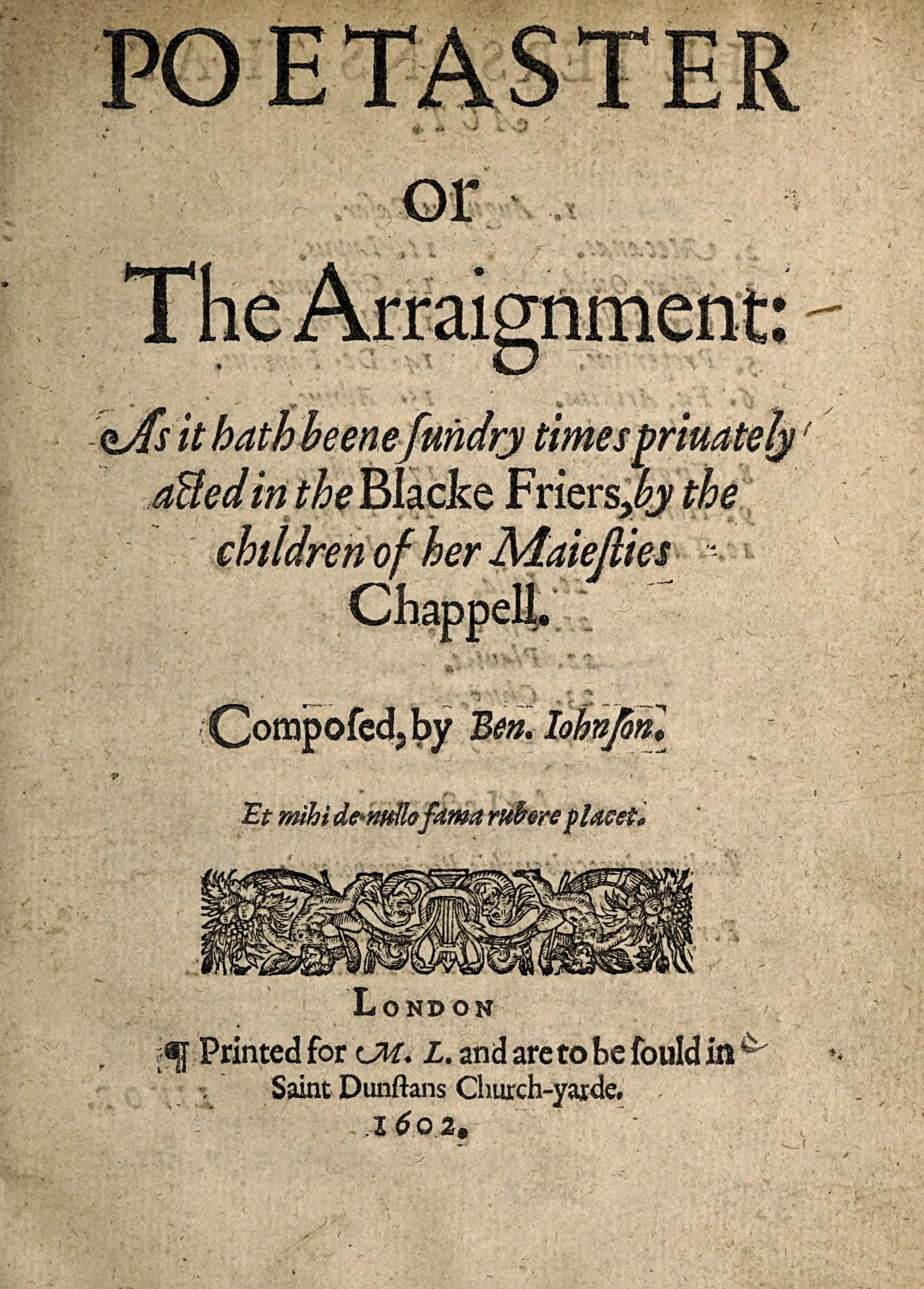
Title page of the first edition of Poetaster (1602)

Poetaster is a late Elizabethan satirical comedy written by Ben Jonson that was first performed in 1601. The play formed one element in the back-and-forth exchange between Jonson and his rivals John Marston and Thomas Dekker in the so-called Poetomachia or War of the Theatres of 1599–1601.

Poetaster was entered into the Stationers' Register on 21 December 1601, and was first published in quarto in 1602 by the bookseller Matthew Lownes. The title page of the first edition states that the play was performed by the Children of the Chapel, one of the companies of boy actors popular at the time. The play was next published in the first folio collection of Jonson's works (1616). A prefatory note to the folio text identifies the main actors in the 1601 production as Nathan Field, John Underwood, Salomon Pavy, William Ostler, Thomas Day, and Thomas Marton. The quarto and folio texts both supply subtitles, with slight variants: in the quarto, the title is Poetaster or The Arraignment, and in the folio, Poetaster, Or His Arraignment.

The principal character in the play is Ovid.

It is widely accepted among scholars and critics that the character of Horace in Poetaster represents Jonson himself, while Crispinus, who vomits up a pretentious and bombastic vocabulary, is Marston, and Demetrius Fannius is Dekker. Individual commentators have attempted to identify other characters in the play with historical and literary figures of the era, including George Chapman and Shakespeare — though these arguments have not been accepted by the scholarly consensus.

It is generally argued that the play is more than a mere venting of personal spleen against two rivals; rather, Jonson attempted in Poetaster to express his views on "the poet's moral duties in society." The play has been considered "an attempt to combine undramatic, philosophical material on good poets with satire on bad poets." Scholars have also traced out a broad range of particular connections between Poetaster, other Jonson works, and plays by other authors in the first years of the 17th century.

The term poetaster, meaning an inferior poet with pretensions to artistic value, had been coined by Erasmus in 1521. It was used by Jonson in 1600 and then popularised with this play a year later.
