= Prosopopeia (poem) =

1601 epic poem by Bento Teixeira

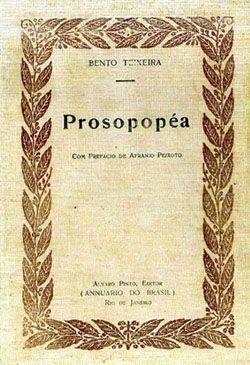
- Front of an edition of Prosopopéia
- Author: Bento Teixeira
- Original title: Prosopopéia
- Language: Portuguese
- Genre: Epic poetry
- Publication date: 1601
- Publication place: Brazil

Prosopopeia (Portuguese Orthographic Formulation of 1943: Prosopopéia) is a 17th-century epic poem written by Portuguese poet Bento Teixeira (c. 1561 – c. 1618). It was first published in 1601 and narrates the adventures of the Albuquerque family; it is dedicated to Jorge d'Albuquerque Coelho (1539 – c. 1596), then-governor of the Captaincy of Pernambuco. Although it can be considered the starting point of the Baroque in Brazilian literature, both its literary merit and association with Brazilian literature has been questioned by modern critics.

Teixeira moved to the colony of Brazil in approximately 1567, first living in Bahia, but fled to Pernambuco when he was accused of being a Jew. Teixeira taught arithmetics, grammar, and Latin in Pernambuco. He returned to Bahia, married in Ilhéus in approximately 1584, and sought refuge in the Monastery of São Bento in Pernambuco after the alleged murder of his wife for adultery. Teixeira wrote Prosopopeia in the monastery during this period.

Prosopopeia is composed of 94 stanzas, written in an epic style. Teixeira was inspired by Luís Vaz de Camões (1524 or 1525 – 10 June 1580), considered by some to be Portugal's and the Portuguese language's greatest poet. In the prologue, addressed to the governor, Teixeira mentions that Prosopopeia would be a sketch of a larger work, one never completed. In the narrative of poem, Triton and other marine deities gather at the Port of Recife to hear from Proteus the past and future glories of the Albuquerque family. Several historical events in early Portuguese colonial history are mentioned in the poem, such as the Second Siege of Diu and the Battle of Alcácer Quibir. According to Clóvis Monteiro, almost all the stanzas "recall Camões due to the disciple's servility to the master ...".
