= War of the Theatres =

Controversy among playwrights in Elizabethan England

The War of the Theatres (also termed, by Thomas Dekker, the Poetomachia or "poets' war") was a controversy in later Elizabethan theatre.

Because of an actual ban on satire in prose and verse publications in 1599 (the Bishops' Ban of 1599), the satirical urge had no other remaining outlet than the stage. The resulting controversy, which unfolded between 1599 and 1602, involved the playwright Ben Jonson on one side and his rivals John Marston and Thomas Dekker (with Thomas Middleton as an ancillary combatant) on the other. The role Shakespeare played in the conflict, if any, has long been a topic of dispute among scholars.

== Sequence of events ==
The least disputed facts of the matter yield a schema like this:

1. In his play Histriomastix (1599), Marston satirized Jonson’s pride through the character Chrisoganus.
2. Jonson responded by satirizing Marston's wordy style in Every Man out of His Humour (1599), a play acted by the Lord Chamberlain's Men. (Note: the order of these first two events has been questioned by James Bednarz, who argues that "(a) Histriomastix was deliberately launched in the final weeks of 1599 to serve as a critique of Jonson's first "comicall satire" Every Man Out, and that (b) Jonson's disparagement of Histriomastix in Every Man Out (III.iv.29) was subsequently added to the acting script of his already completed play, before the end of the same year, as a rejoinder to Marston's initial attack.")
3. Marston, in turn, replied with Jack Drum's Entertainment (1600), a play acted by the Children of Paul's, satirizing Jonson as Brabant Senior, a cuckold.
4. In Cynthia's Revels (1600), acted by the Children of the Chapel, Jonson satirizes both Marston and Dekker. The former is thought to be represented by the character Hedon, a "light voluptuous reveller," and the latter by Anaides, a "strange arrogating puff."
5. Marston next attacked Jonson in What You Will (1601), a play most likely acted by the Children of Paul's.
6. Jonson responded with The Poetaster (1601), by the Children of the Chapel again, in which Jonson portrays the character representing Marston as vomiting bombastic and ridiculous words he has ingested.
7. Dekker completed the sequence with Satiromastix (1601), which mocks Jonson ("Horace") as an arrogant and overbearing hypocrite. The play was acted by both the Children of Paul's and the Lord Chamberlain's Men.

Bednarz 2001 argues that Shakespeare participated in the end of the poetomachia, in Troilus and Cressida (1601/1602), treating the character Ajax ("a jakes") as in part a scatalogically inflected sendup of Jonson. Steve Roth argues for Hamlet's extensive participation in 1601, in the whole central "players" section of the play — from their arrival through the mousetrap play and its immediate aftermath. Apparently Jonson and Marston later came to terms and even collaborated with George Chapman on the play Eastward Hoe in 1605. That play offended King James with its anti-Scottish satire, a part apparently written by Marston. While Marston evaded capture, Jonson and Chapman ended up in jail as a result.

== Context ==
Shakespeare probably alludes to the War of the Theatres in a scene between Hamlet and Rosencrantz and Guildenstern:

Rosencrantz: Faith, there has been much to do on both sides; and the nation holds it no sin to tar them to controversy: there was, for a while, no money bid for argument unless the poet and the player went to cuffs in the question.
Hamlet: Is't possible?
Guildenstern: O, there has been much throwing about of brains. (Hamlet 2.2.362-9)

Scholars differ over the true nature and extent of the rivalry behind the Poetomachia. Some have seen it as a competition between theatre companies rather than individual writers, though this is a minority view. It has even been suggested that the playwrights involved had no serious rivalry and even admired each other, and that the "War" was a self-promotional publicity stunt, a "planned ... quarrel to advertise each other as literary figures and for profit." Most critics see the Poetomachia as a mixture of personal rivalries and serious artistic concerns—"a vehicle for aggressively expressing differences...in literary theory...[a] basic philosophical debate on the status of literary and dramatic authorship."
