= Samuel Sheppard (writer) =

English writer

The Reverend Samuel Sheppard

Personal details
- Born: c. 1624
- Died: c. 1655
- Denomination: Presbyterian
- Occupation: Writer

Samuel Sheppard (c. 1624–c. 1655; fl. 1646) was an English writer and poet of the Civil War who sometimes published under the anagrammatic pseudonym Raphael Desmus.

== Life ==
Samuel Sheppard was the son of Harman Sheppard, physician, who died on 12 July 1639, aged ninety, by his wife Petronella née Parnell, who died on 10 September 1650. His parents married at Christ Church, London, on 10 April 1623, and Sheppard seems to have grown up in London and its environs. He was related to Sir Christopher Clapham of Beamsley in Yorkshire, to whom he dedicated several of his books. No record of his education survives, though he appears to have taken holy orders and become a Presbyterian minister: John Hackluyt, a rival writer, called Sheppard a "blasphemous Cleargy-spot". (Note: Metropolitan Nuncio, 3, 6–13 June 1649, C.i.v.)

Sheppard commenced his literary career about 1606 as amanuensis to Ben Jonson, but wrote nothing himself till a later period. From 1646 to 1654 he wrote copiously, in news weeklies, prose reports, essays, poetry, and drama, about the events of the Civil War. Like his connections the Claphams, Sheppard was an ardent Royalist. He twice suffered imprisonment for his opinions, once in 1650 in Whittington College, (Note: Calendar of State Papers, Domestic, 1649–50 p. 529, 1650 p. 143.) and again for fourteen months in Newgate. His wife's name was Mary.

== Works ==
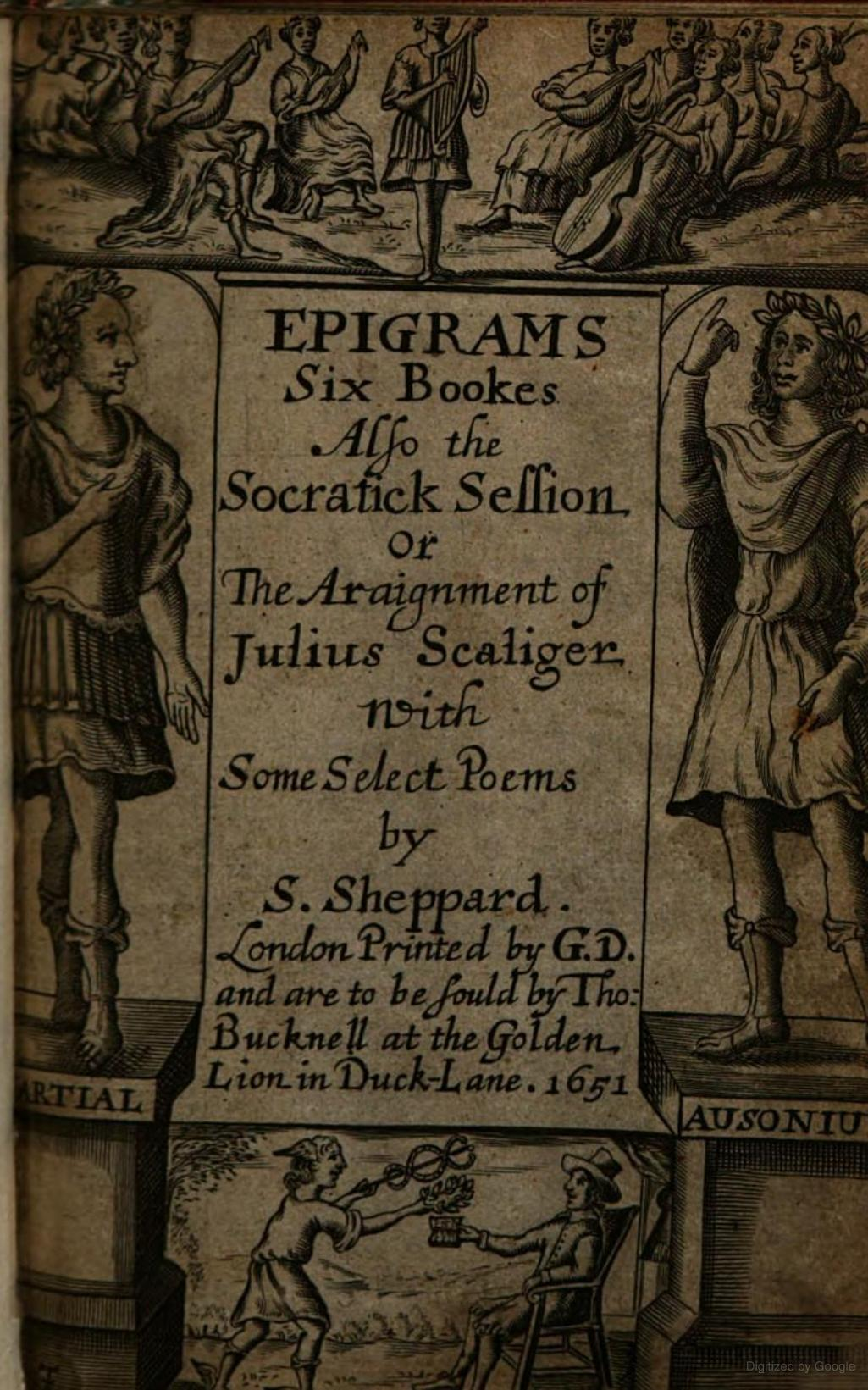
Epigrams (1651)

He was the author of:

1. The Farmers Farmed, London, 1646, 4to.
2. The False Alarm, London, 1646, 4to. 3.
3. The Year of Jubilee, London, 1646, 4to.
4. The Times displayed in Six Sestyads, London, 1646, 4to.
5. The Committee Man Curried, London, 1647, 4to (two short farces almost entirely made up of plagiarisms from Sir John Suckling).
6. Grand Pluto's Progress through Great Britain, 1647. (Note: Lilly's Catalogue, 1844.)
7. The Loves of Amandus and Sophronia, London, 1650, 8vo.
8. Epigrams, London, 1651, 8vo.
9. The Joviall Crew, London, 1651, 4to.
10. Discoveries, or an Explication of some Enigmatic Verities. Also a Seraphick Rhapsodie on the Passion of Jesus Christ, London, 1652.

He was wrongly credited with writing a ballad, 'The Parliament Routed', London, 1653. which was more likely written by Samuel Smithson, a poet, popular ballad writer and occasional pamphleteer of the 1650s. Smithson's authorship was frequently signified only by his initials 'S. S.', which has made attribution more difficult.

Hazlitt also ascribes to him the preface to Captain Hobson's Fallacy of Infant Baptism Discovered, London, 1645, 4to, together with God and Mammon, 1646, 4to, The Weepers, London, 1652, 4to, and a ballad, St. George for England, London, 1650 - though this too is likely to have been by Smithson. (Note: Hazlitt, Handbook, n.p.) All these pieces and items 3, 4, 7, 8, and 9 above are in the British Library. Some lines by Sheppard preface Thomas Manly's Veni, Vidi, Vici, London, 1652, 8vo, and he left in manuscript (now in the Bodleian Library) The Faerie King, a continuation of Spenser's Faerie Queene.
