= Calobates =

Calobates may refer to:

- Calobates or kalobates, a term for ancient Greek rope-dancers
- Calobates, a synonym for Carpococcyx, a genus of ground-cuckoos
