= Jacob Hall =

Jacob Hall (fl. 1668) was an English rope-dancer, who distinguished himself as a performer on the tight-rope.

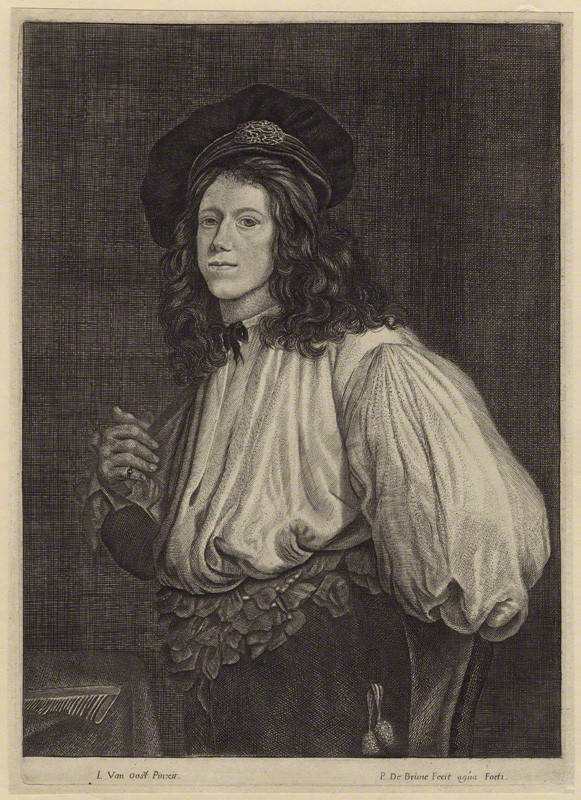
Jacob Hall (traditional attribution).

== Career ==
The memoirs of Philibert de Gramont indicate that Hall was a popular performer by 1662. In 1668 Hall attained his greatest popularity. The London court encouraged him, and he described himself as "sworn servant to his Majestie". Lady Castlemain, later the Duchess of Cleveland, to avenge herself on Charles II for neglecting her, fell—according to Samuel Pepys and Gramont—in love with him. In April 1668 he was a regular visitor at her house, and received a salary from her.

Hall appears to have given his earliest entertainment in a booth at Smithfield, in connection with Bartholomew Fair. Pepys witnessed his performance there on 28 August 1668, and described his dancing on ropes. On 21 September 1668 Pepys attended again, and then met Hall at a tavern. Hall told Pepys that he had often fallen, but had never broken a limb.

A placard was issued describing the performances of "himself and those of Mr. Richard Lancashire, with several others of their companies".' Hall and his friends promised dancing and vaulting on the ropes, with a variety of feats of activity and agility, including "doing of somersets and flipflaps, flying over thirty rapiers, and over several men's heads, and also flying through several hoops". Hall challenged others to do the like.

Subsequently Hall began to build a booth in Charing Cross, and was committed to prison for continuing its erection after the local authorities had ordered its demolition. But his influence with the king's mistress enabled him to complete the booth. He also erected a stage in Lincoln's Inn Fields, but the inhabitants intervened again, with the result that his performances there were inhibited. On 4 September 1679 William Blaythwaite, in a letter to Robert Southwell, mentioned that he had just witnessed Hall's exhibitions of agility. Robert Wild, in his Rome Rhymed to Death (1683), John Dryden, in his epilogue to Nat Lee's Mithridates, and Dr. John King, in his Collection of Riddles, refer to his skill; and in the second edition of the collection entitled Wit and Drollery (1682) he is described as still delighting London with his jumping.

A picture of Hall, heavily dressed on a tight-rope, with a balancing rod in his hands, forms the frontispiece to News from Bartholomew Fair, or the World's Mad. A portrait by Van Oost of a man richly dressed was adopted as a representation of Hall in early editions of Antoine Hamilton's Mémoires de la vie du comte de Grammont. The identification of the image above is attributed to Ames.
