= Osten (surname) =

The German-language surname Osten may refer to:

- Franz Osten, German filmmaker
- Maria Osten, German and Soviet journalist
- Cathy Osten
- Suzanne Osten
- Manfred Osten
- Cornelius Osten
- Ariel Gerardo Nahuelpan Osten

The noble surname von der Osten, associated with the Von der Osten family, may refer to:

- von der Osten family
- Adolph Sigfried von der Osten
- Anton von Prokesch-Osten
- Eva von der Osten
- Hans von Tschammer und Osten
- Hans-Georg von der Osten (1895-1987), German flying ace
- Vali von der Osten
- Lina Heydrich, born Lina Mathilde von Osten

== See also ==
- van Osten
- van Oosten
- Osten-Sacken
