= Rope-dancing =

Acrobatic activity

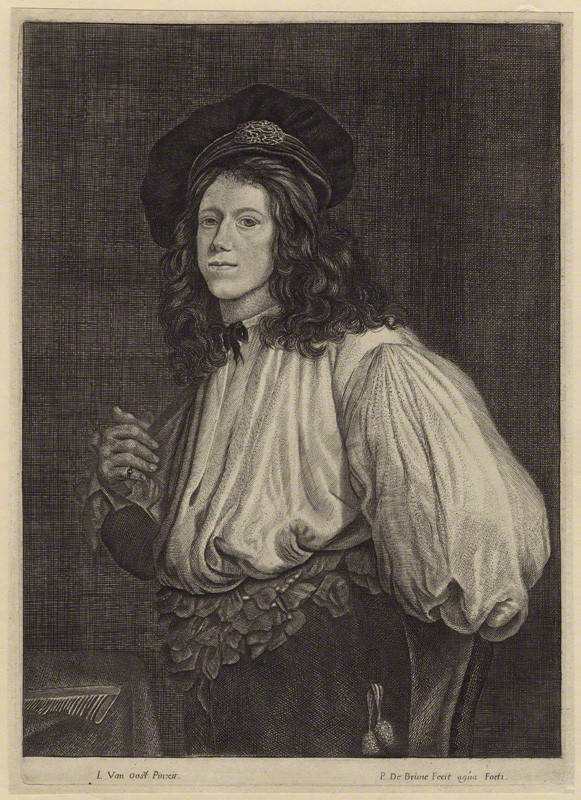
Jacob Hall was a famous rope-dancer in London during the reign of King Charles II

Rope-dancing is the general art and act of performing on or with a rope.

There are a variety of forms and techniques which have been used throughout history. These include:

- Chinese jump rope – in which a circular rope is used to make patterns in a technique which resembles hopscotch and the cat's cradle
- Rope-sliding – in which the performer slides down a tight rope or cable somewhat like a modern zip line
- Skipping – in which the performer repeatedly jumps over a swinging rope
- Slackwire – in which the rope or wire is slack and so a swinging technique is needed
- Tightrope walking – in which the rope or wire is tight and a balancing technique is used

== History ==
Rope-dancers were famous among ancient Greeks and Romans. The Greeks called a rope-dancer/rope-walker as schoenobates (σχοινοβάτης) and kalobates (καλοβάτης) and the Romans, funambulus. In Herculaneum there are a series of paintings representing rope-dancing. Germanicus and the emperor Galba even attempted to exhibit elephants walking on the rope.

In 165 BC, the first production of Terence's play Hecyra failed due to the rival attraction of rope-dancing, as recounted by the prologue.

Hecyra est huic nomen fabulae: haec cum data
Nova est novum intervenit vitium et calamitas,
Ut neque spectari neque cognosci potuerit.
Ita populus studio stupidus in funambulo animum occuparat.

Hecyra is the name of this Play;
when it was presented for the first time,
an unusual calamity interrupted it,
so that it could not be witnessed throughout;
the people gave their attention to some rope-dancing.

== See also ==
- Abseiling
- Indian rope trick
