= Van Oosten =

Van Oosten is a Dutch toponymic surname meaning "from the east". People with the surname include:

- Ben van Oosten (born 1955), Dutch classical organist, academic and writer
- Foort van Oosten (born 1977), Dutch VVD politician
- Gerrit Willem van Oosten de Bruyn (1727–1797), Dutch lawyer
- Gertrude van der Oosten or Geertrui van Oosten (ca.1320–1358), Dutch Beguine and mystic
- Izaak van Oosten (1613–1661), Flemish landscape and cabinet painter
- Keetie van Oosten-Hage (born 1949), Dutch racing cyclist
- Lauren van Oosten (born 1978), Canadian swimmer
- Marion Van Oosten (1914–2010), American ten-pin bowler
- Marsel van Oosten (born 1967), Dutch photographer
- Roald van Oosten (born 1969), Dutch musician from the band Caesar

== Van Oost ==
- Jacob van Oost (1603–1671), Flemish history and portrait painter
- Jacob van Oost the Younger (1639–1713), Flemish portrait and genre painter, son of the above
- Dominique van Oost (1677–1738), Flemish portrait painter, son of the above

== See also ==
- van Osten
- von der Osten
