= 1597 in literature =

This article contains information about the literary events and publications of 1597.

== Events ==
- February – Pembroke's Men contract with Francis Langley to play the next year at his new Swan Theatre in London.
- By March – Romeo and Juliet becomes the first of Shakespeare's plays to be published as a "bad quarto".
- March 17 – After the death of William Brooke, 10th Baron Cobham on March 5, his place as Lord Chamberlain of England is taken by George Carey, 2nd Baron Hunsdon, son of a previous Lord Chamberlain. Lord Hunsdon reverses Cobham's policy of hostility toward the actors in English Renaissance theatre and returns to his father's policy of general tolerance and patronage. The playing company under his patronage, which includes William Shakespeare and Richard Burbage, becomes the Lord Chamberlain's Men.
- April 23 – The feast for the Order of the Garter at the Palace of Whitehall in London is a likely occasion for the first performance of Shakespeare's comedy The Merry Wives of Windsor.
- c. May 1 – The first performance of George Chapman's An Humorous Day's Mirth is the first comedy of humours played by the Admiral's Men at The Rose Theatre in London.
- July – The season goes disastrously wrong for Pembroke's Men, when they stage the scandalous play The Isle of Dogs in London. This provokes the authorities to close all of the London theatres for the remainder of the summer. Ben Jonson, co-writer of the play with Thomas Nashe, is arrested on the orders of Queen Elizabeth I of England's "interrogator", Richard Topcliffe, briefly jailed in Marshalsea Prison, and charged with "Leude and mutynous behavior".
- December – Miguel de Cervantes is jailed in Seville for discrepancies in his accounts as a tax collector.

== New books ==
=== Prose ===
- Francis Bacon – Essays
- Thomas Beard – The Theatre of God's Judgements
- William Burton and Thomas Creede (translated from the Greek of Achilles Tatius) – The Most Delectable and Pleasaunt History of Clitiphon and Leucippe (translated from Leucippe and Clitophon)
- Johannes Vodnianus Campanus – Turcicorum tyrannorum qui inde usque ab Otomanno rebus Turcicis praefuerunt, descriptio
- Gabriel Harvey – The Trimming of Thomas Nashe Gentleman
- Christopher Middleton – The Famous Historie of Chinon of England
- Thomas Morley – Plain and Easy Introduction to Practical Music
- Dinko Zlatarić – Ljubav i smrt Pirama i Tizbe, iz veće tuđijeh jezika u hrvacki složene (Love and Death of Pyramus and Thisbe, Translated into Croatian from Several Foreign Languages)
- Antonio Possevino – Apparatus ad omnium gentium historiam
- James VI – Daemonologie
- Piotr Skarga – Kazania sejmowe (Sejm Sermons)

=== Drama ===
- George Chapman – An Humorous Day's Mirth
- Richard Hathwaye – King Arthur
- John Lyly – The Woman in the Moon published
- John Marston – Histriomastix
- Anthony Munday and Michael Drayton – Mother Redcap
- Thomas Nashe and Ben Jonson – The Isle of Dogs
- William Shakespeare
  - The Merry Wives of Windsor
  - Richard II, Richard III, and Romeo and Juliet (the "bad quarto") published

=== Poetry ===
- Michael Drayton – Englands Heroicall Epistles

== Births ==
- February 24 – Vincent Voiture, French poet (died 1648)
- July 5 – Sigismondo Boldoni, Italian writer, poet, and physician (died 1630)
- December 23 – Martin Opitz von Boberfeld, German poet (died 1639)
- Unknown date – Wang Wei (王微), Chinese poet and prostitute (died 1647)
- Approximate year – Thomas Cage, English writer and cleric (died 1656)

== Deaths ==
- February 2 – James Burbage, English actor (born c. 1530)
- February 6 – Franciscus Patricius, Italian philosopher and scientist (born 1529)
- June 6 – William Hunnis, English poet
- July 20 – Franciscus Raphelengius, Flemish-born printer and bookseller (born 1539)
- October 28 – Aldus Manutius the Younger, Italian grammarian and proprietor of the Aldine Press (born 1547)
- December 11 – Jakob Miller, Catholic reformist theologian (born 1550)
