= Playing company =

Term for a company of theatrical actors in Renaissance-era London

In Renaissance-era London, playing company was the usual term for a company of actors. These companies were organised around a group of ten or so shareholders (or "sharers"), who performed in the plays but were also responsible for management. The sharers employed "hired men" – that is, the minor actors and the workers behind the scenes. The major companies were based at specific theatres in London; the most successful of them, William Shakespeare's company the King's Men, had the open-air Globe Theatre for summer seasons and the enclosed Blackfriars Theatre in the winters. The Admiral's Men occupied the Rose Theatre in the 1590s, and the Fortune Theatre in the early 17th century.

Less fortunate companies spent most of their existences touring the provinces; when Worcester's Men gained official permission to perform in London in 1602, they were, in a manner of speaking, "coming in from the cold" of a life of constant touring.

== Origins ==
The development of theatre in England in the 16th and 17th centuries was not an isolated phenomenon; similar developments occurred simultaneously in other European countries, to greater or lesser degrees. The same broad factors influenced English actors as those that affected actors in neighboring countries, especially Scotland, France, Denmark, and states in northern Germany like Saxony and the Rhineland Palatinate. Yet conditions in other societies also differed significantly from those in England; the following discussion applies specifically to England in the 16th century and 17th century.

In the later Medieval and early Renaissance periods, wealthy and powerful English noble houses sometimes maintained a troupe of half a dozen "players", just as noblemen kept jesters or jugglers for entertainment. English theatre benefited greatly from the predilection for theatricality displayed by the Tudors. Henry VII kept a company of players called the "Lusores Regis", which probably consisted of four men and a boy who were used to swift costume changes and multiple roles. In the early period the difference between players, acrobats and other entertainers was not hard and fast. A troupe of players, however, was more costly to keep than a jester; players (who usually had other household duties as well) could defray expenses by touring to various cities and performing for profit – a practice that began the evolution away from the medieval model of noble patronage and toward the commercial and capitalistic model of modern entertainment. It is from the scattered records of such touring, and from occasional performances at the English Royal Court, that our very limited knowledge of English Renaissance theatre in the early and middle 16th century derives.

One curious development of this era was the development of companies of pre-pubescent boy actors. The use of the boy player in companies of adult actors to play female parts can be traced far back in the history of medieval theatre, in the famous mystery plays and moralities; the employment of casts of boys for entire dramatic productions began in the early 16th century, which utilized the boys' choirs connected with cathedrals, churches, and schools. In time the practice took on a professional aspect and companies of child actors would play an important role in the development of drama through the Elizabethan era and into the Jacobean and Caroline periods that followed. (See: Children of the Chapel; Children of Paul's; Beeston's Boys; King's Revels Children.)

English Renaissance playing company timeline

This timeline charts the existence of major English playing companies from 1572 ("Acte for the punishment of Vacabondes", which legally restricted acting to players with a patron of sufficient degree) to 1642 (the closing of the theatres by Parliament). A variety of strolling players, and even early London-based troupes existed before 1572. The situations were often fluid, and much of this history is obscure; this timeline necessarily implies more precision than exists in some cases. The labels down the left indicate the most common names for the companies. The bar segments indicate the specific patron. In the case of children's companies (a distinct legal situation) some founders are noted.

== Costs ==
The playing companies did not need to spend money on scenery, and their stage props were often basic (necessarily, since every company made a substantial portion of its income by touring, and some companies toured consistently with no home theatre). Their costs in costumes, however, were high: actors playing kings, cardinals, princes, and noblemen had to look the part. Companies had hundreds of pounds of value invested in their costumes, in "glaring satin suits" and "sumptuous dresses" – "cloaks in scarlet with gold laces and buttons, and in purple satin adorned with silver;" doublets of "carnation velvet, flame, ginger, red and green; and women's gowns in white satin and cloth of gold." In 1605, Edward Alleyn estimated that his share in the "apparell" of the Admiral's Men was worth £100 – and Alleyn was one of nine sharers in the company at the time. When a company got itself into financial difficulties, the members sometimes had to pawn their costumes, as Pembroke's Men did in the plague year of 1593.

In 1605 the actor Augustine Phillips left specific pieces of his wardrobe to an apprentice in his last will and testament – including his "mouse-colored" velvet hose, purple cloak, white taffeta doublet, and black taffeta suit. To a modern sensibility, this may sound quaint and odd; but when "a doublet and hose of seawater green satin cost £3", the monetary value of Phillips' items was not negligible. Actors could face serious penalties for appropriating the costumes of their companies. [See Robert Dawes for an example.] (The players could defray some of their costs in the used clothing market. As an example, the King's Men bought discarded items of Gondomar's wardrobe for the actor playing the Black Knight in A Game at Chess. Often, "eminent lords and knights at their decease" would leave articles of their finery to their servants – much of it "unseemly" for servingmen and women to wear. Such garments would end up the property of the actors.)

A second major cost lay in play scripts. In the years around 1600, playwrights could be paid as little as £6 to £7 per play (or about the price of two suits). Yet since the companies acted a constantly changing repertory, they needed an abundant supply of plays. Philip Henslowe's Diary records dozens of titles for the 1597–1603 period; when Worcester's Men were setting up for their first London season in 1602, they purchased a dozen new plays from Henslowe's stable of house playwrights, to supplement their existing stock.

The sharers in the company also paid wages to their hired men and boys. Wages differed somewhat over time and from company to company and case to case; but the general average minimum was 1 shilling per man per day, the same wage as that of an artisan worker. Boys cost perhaps half as much, though they were often maintained under some version of an apprenticeship arrangement, which could vary widely in details.

== Scheduling ==
Performances at the public theatres were generally allowed six days per week; the theatres were closed on Sundays and major religious holidays like Good Friday. Other restrictions were laid upon the players, some of which they evaded as consistently as they could. They were supposed to cease playing entirely during Lent – but violated this stricture regularly. In the spring of 1592, for example, the Lord Strange's Men played daily at the Rose Theatre right through Lent. After 1623, companies circumvented the Lenten restriction through the simple expedient of paying bribes to Sir Henry Herbert, the Master of the Revels.

One restriction that the players observed, one that was too serious to violate, was the prohibition enforced whenever bubonic plague rose from endemic to epidemic levels. Through much of the English Renaissance period, the theatres were shut down when the death figures in the plague bill (the weekly mortality report for London and some suburban parishes) rose above a certain level. In 1604 that cut-off number was set at 30 per week; in 1607 it was raised to 40. A serious epidemic closed the theatres almost entirely from June 1592 through April 1594; 11,000 Londoners died of plague in 1593. (The plague tended to abate in the colder weather of winter; the theatres opened for short seasons during the winter months of those years.) 1603 was another bad plague year, with 30,000 deaths in London; the theatres were closed from March 1603 to perhaps April 1604.

Other serious epidemics caused theatre closures in 1625 (for eight months, to October) and from May 1636 to October 1637. These periods of closure were always traumatically difficult for the acting troupes; some survived by touring cities and towns outside London...and some didn't survive at all.

== The Elizabethan Age ==
The explosion of popular drama that began when James Burbage built the first fixed and permanent venue for drama, The Theatre, in 1576 was the one great step away from the medieval organizational model and toward the commercial theatre; but that evolution was, at best, a "work in progress" throughout the English Renaissance. Throughout this period, troupes of actors needed to maintain the patronage of a noble household. The prevailing legal system in England defined "masterless men" who traveled about the country as vagabonds, and subjected them to treatments of varying harshness. Local authorities tended to be more hostile than welcoming toward players; the Corporation of London, from the Lord Mayor and aldermen down, was famously hostile to acting troupes, as were the Puritans. Noble patronage was, at the very least, the legal fig leaf that allowed professional players to function in society.

In some cases, more so toward the end of the period, noble patronage was nothing more than that legal fig leaf; a company of actors was an independent entity, financially and otherwise. Conversely, some noblemen were beneficent patrons of their players. The Lords Hunsdon – Henry Carey, 1st Baron Hunsdon (c. 1524–96), and his son George Carey, 2nd Baron Hunsdon (1547–1603) – were valuable protectors of their own company, and, when they served in the office of Lord Chamberlain (1585–96 and 1597–1603 respectively), of English drama as a whole.

That company of Hunsdon's, known to posterity as The Lord Chamberlain's Men, was organized somewhat like a modern joint-stock commercial company (the concept of which was just beginning to evolve in this era) at its re-formation in 1594, after the long plague closure. The company had a small number of partners or shareholders, who pooled their funds to pay expenses and in turn shared the profits, in what was largely a de facto democratic way (at least for the sharers, if not for the hired men and apprentices they employed). Their main rivals, the Admiral's Men, suffered in contrast under a less ideal version of capitalist organization: Philip Henslowe functioned more like a blend of big-business autocrat, landlord, and loan shark. He managed multiple companies of actors and built and owned several theatres, and controlled players (sharers included) and playwrights by doling out payments and loans. (The silver lining in this cloud is that Henslowe's surviving financial records provide a wealth of detailed knowledge about the theatre conditions in his era that is unparalleled by any other source.) Other companies varied between these extremes of organization. (Francis Langley, builder of the Swan Theatre, operated much as Henslowe did, though less successfully, and for a shorter time.)

Drama in the age of Elizabeth was at best an organized disorder; suppression of individual companies, and even the profession as a whole, for political reasons was not unknown. [See: The Isle of Dogs.] Local residents sometimes opposed theatres in their neighborhoods. Individual companies of actors struggled and failed and recombined; tracking the changes has been the obsession of scholars and the bane of students.

The drama was also popular, from the Queen and Court down to the common people; indeed, the polarity of the theatre audience in this period, with the High and the Low favoring the drama, and the middle class generally more hostile with the growth of Puritan sentiments, is an intriguing phenomenon. Theatres proliferated, especially (though not exclusively) in neighborhoods outside the city's walls and the Corporation's control – in Shoreditch to the north, or the Bankside and Paris Garden in Southwark, on the southern bank of the River Thames: the Curtain, the Rose, the Swan, the Fortune, the Globe, the Blackfrairs – a famous roster.

== The Jacobean and Caroline Eras ==
King James, "VI and I", was passionately fond of drama; and theatrical activity at Court accelerated from the start of his reign. Consider the following figures.

In roughly the last decade of Elizabeth's reign, 1594–1603, there were 64 theatrical performances at Court, for an average of 6 or 7 a year:

Chamberlain's Men	32
Admiral's Men	20
other adult companies	5
boys' companies	7

Compare a total of 299 for a somewhat longer period in the first portion of James' reign, 1603–16, an average of more than 20 per year:

King's Men	177
Prince Henry's Men	47
other adult companies	57
boys' companies	18

The major companies acquired royal patronage: the Lord Chamberlain's Men became the King's Men, and the Admiral's Men became Prince Henry's Men, under the patronage of the King's eldest son. A company of Queen Anne's Men was built out of the pre-existent Oxford's and Pembroke's Men, companies that were largely devoted to touring the provinces in the previous reign. In 1608 a company was organized under the title of the King's second son, the eight-year-old Charles; this company, the Duke of York's Men, was called Prince Charles's Men after Prince Henry unexpectedly died in 1612.

Companies continued to form, evolve, and dissolve in the early Jacobean era – the King's Revels Children, the Lady Elizabeth's Men; but by the midpoint of James' reign, around the time of Shakespeare's death in 1616, the dramatic scene had generally stabilized into four important companies. These were: the King's Men, at the Globe and Blackfriars Theatres; Palsgrave's Men (formerly the Admiral's and Prince Henry's Men), at the Fortune; Prince Charles's Men, at the Hope; and Queen Anne's Men, at the Red Bull Theatre.

Theatrical evolution continued, sometimes tied to the lives and deaths of royal patrons. Queen Anne's Men disbanded with the death of Anne of Denmark in 1619; the accession of a new queen in 1625 saw the creation of Queen Henrietta's Men. Occasionally there were other new companies like Beeston's Boys, and new theatres like the Salisbury Court. The two prolonged closings of the London theatres due to plague, in 1625 and 1636–37, caused significant disruption in the acting profession, with companies breaking apart, combining and re-combining, and switching theatres, in a dizzying confusion. (Only the King's Men were exempt.) Political suppressions also came along in the Stuart era, though they affected only single offending companies – until a general political suppression closed the theatres from 1642 to 1660, and brought the age of English Renaissance theatre to its end.

== See also ==
- English Renaissance theatre
- Elizabethan theatre
- Jacobean theatre
