= Sussex's Men =

English playing company

The Earl of Sussex's Men was a playing company or troupe of actors in Elizabethan and Jacobean England, most notable for their connection with the early career of William Shakespeare.

== First phase ==
Thomas Radclyffe, 3rd Earl of Sussex was one of the most powerful aristocrats during the middle years of Queen Elizabeth I's reign; he was named Lord Chamberlain in 1572. Like other prominent noblemen of the period, he kept a troupe of players among his retainers. The limited records of the era reveal the existence of such troupes of actors, like Leicester's Men, Pembroke's Men, or Worcester's Men, mainly in the documents of the cities they visited during their tours of the country; similarly, Sussex's Men enter the historical record when they performed in Nottingham in March 1569. From then through the 1570s they also played in Maldon, Ipswich, Canterbury, Dover, Bristol, and other towns; the troupe had six members during this era. Since their patron was serving as Lord Chamberlain, they were sometimes called the Lord Chamberlain's Men — though they should not be confused with the more famous Lord Chamberlain's Men of the 1590s, the company of Shakespeare and Richard Burbage.

Given their patron's status, it is not surprising that Sussex's Men played at Court several times in this period, most often during the Christmas holidays. Their repertory consisted of anonymous and now-lost plays that are known only by their titles: The Red Knight, The Cruelty of a Stepmother, and Murderous Michael are three examples. The company acted The Cynocephali ("Dog-heads") at Court on 2 February 1577. John Adams was apparently the leader of the troupe (he received their fees for them); Richard Tarlton began his career with Sussex's Men in these years, before going to Queen Elizabeth's Men in 1583.

In 1583 the 3rd Earl of Sussex died childless, and was succeeded by his younger brother Henry Radclyffe as 4th Earl. During the ten years he held the earldom, Sussex's Men are known primarily through their provincial tours. In 1590 and 1591 they formed a temporary alliance with Queen Elizabeth's Men, formerly the leading company of the time but then in decline.

== The early 1590s ==
Sussex's Men ended a near-decade absence from Court with a performance there on 2 January 1592. At around this time they may have been connected with Christopher Marlowe and Thomas Kyd, though specific details have not survived.

It was in the winter of 1593–94, during an especially difficult epidemic of bubonic plague, that Sussex's Men achieved their greatest prominence and importance. Because of the plague, the London theatres were closed almost continuously for two years, from the summer of 1592 to the spring of 1594; during the cold months of winter, however, the plague tended to abate, and theatrical manager and promoter Philip Henslowe was able to open his Rose Theatre for truncated winter seasons in both years. In 1592–93, Lord Strange's Men were at the Rose; but the next year that company was touring the countryside, and Henslowe brought in Sussex's Men for a season running from December 26, 1593 to February 6, 1594. (Whether the death of the 4th Earl of Sussex in 1593, and the succession of his son Robert Radclyffe as 5th Earl, was significant in this is not known.)

Usually, the acting companies of the period owned their own plays, which they purchased outright from playwrights; Henslowe was unusual in that he owned some plays personally, and the acting troupes who worked with (or for) him could act those plays. In this way, Sussex's Men performed Marlowe's The Jew of Malta on February 4, 1594 — a play that has previously been in the repertory of Lord Strange's Men. In their six-week winter season at the Rose, Sussex's Men performed 30 times, giving 13 different plays at least once. Again, their repertory consisted mostly of anonymous and now-lost plays, like Richard the Confessor, King Lud, Abraham and Lot, and The Fair Maid of Italy — though they also performed the extant George a Greene (published 1599) four times.

== Shakespeare ==
The crucial item in their Rose repertory was the play that Henslowe's Diary consistently calls Titus & Ondronicus, which Sussex's Men played three times, on January 23 and 28 and February 6, 1594. The play was popular, and produced high profits for Henslowe, of 40 shillings or more at each performance. Scholars unanimously recognize this as Shakespeare's Titus Andronicus. When Shakespeare's Titus was first published in 1594, the title page of the first quarto states that the play was acted by three different companies, Lord Strange's Men (also called Derby's Men), Pembroke's Men, and Sussex's Men. Lord Strange's Men had acted a Titus & Vespacian in 1592; scholars debate the relationship between the two Titus plays, though since the earlier work is no longer extant the relationship cannot be fully or finally ascertained. (Our English version of the play has no character named Vespasian, and this could have been a play about the father-and-son Roman emperors Vespasian and Titus. However, a German version of Titus Andronicus made in Shakespeare's time included a major character named Vespasian, which could indicate a lost earlier version which was taken into Germany.)

== Decline ==
In the spring of 1594, the plague abated and the London theatres opened for a sustained period. Sussex's Men teamed with Queen Elizabeth's Men for two joint performances of Robert Greene's Friar Bacon and Friar Bungay in early April; but after that, Sussex's Men disappeared from the London theatre scene. Perhaps they were squeezed out by more formidable competition from the re-organized Admiral's Men and Lord Chamberlain's Men. They returned to touring and playing the provinces, where they are known as late as 1618.

== Bibliography ==
- Scott McMillin, "Sussex's Men in 1594: The Evidence of Titus Andronicus and The Jew of Malta", in Theatre Survey 32.2 (1991): 214-23
- Andrew Gurr, The Shakespearian Playing Companies (Oxford University Press, 1996)
- MacCaffrey, Wallace T, “Radcliffe, Henry, fourth earl of Sussex (1533–1593),” Oxford Dictionary of National Biography (Oxford University Press, 2004).
- Victor Stater, “Radcliffe, Robert, fifth earl of Sussex (1573–1629),” Oxford Dictionary of National Biography (Oxford University Press, 2004).
- Roslyn L. Knutson. "What's So Special About 1594?" Shakespeare Quarterly 61.4 (2010): 449-67.
- Lawrence Manley and Sally-Beth MacLean, Lord Strange's Men and their Plays (Yale University Press, 2014), 322-5
