= Gabriel Spenser =

English actor (c. 1578-1598)

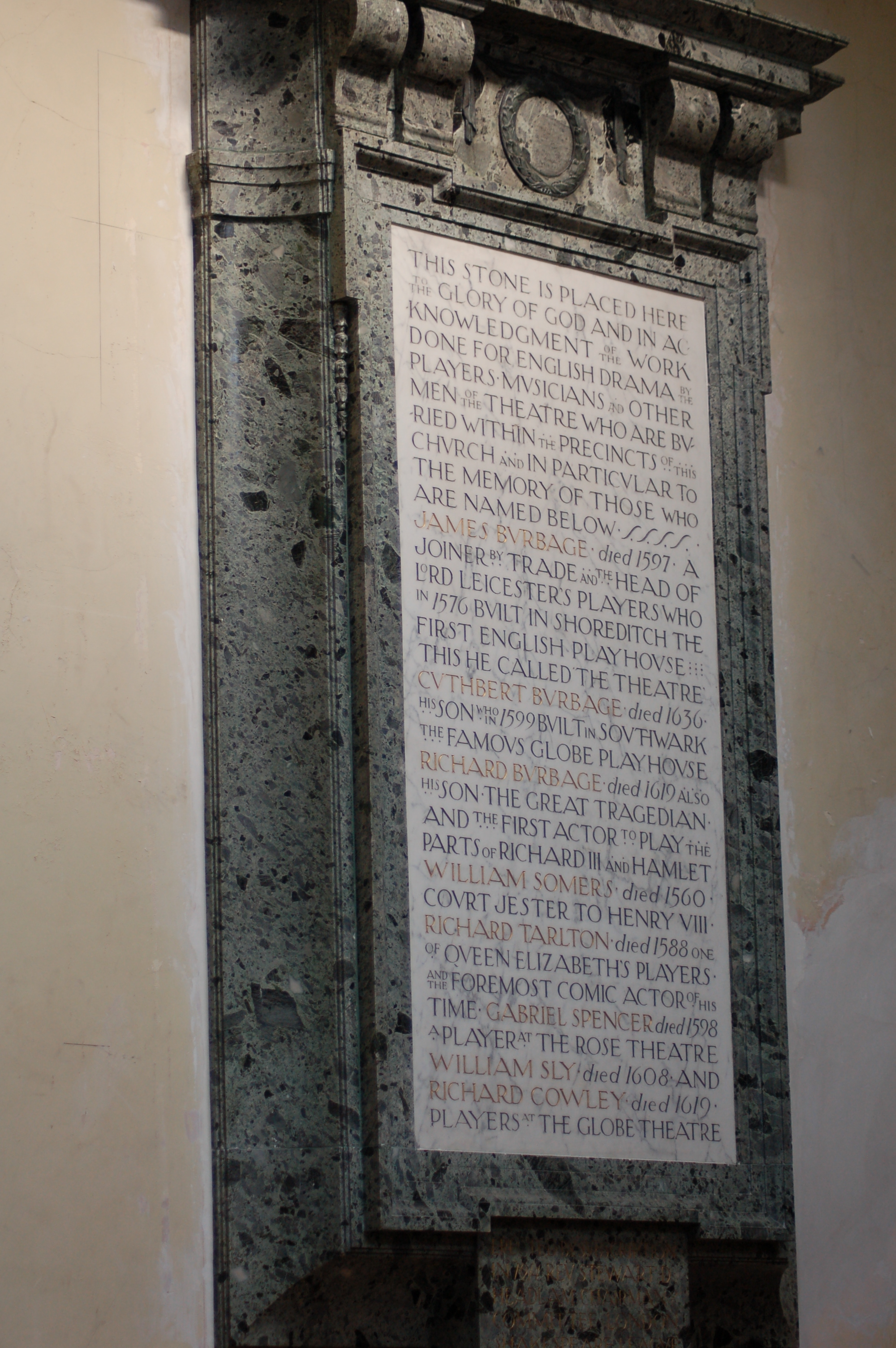
- A memorial plaque in St Leonard's, Shoreditch commemorating Spenser and other actors.
- Born: c. 1578
- Died: 1598 (aged 19–20); Hoxton, London
- Occupation: Actor
- Years active: 1596-1598

Gabriel Spenser, also spelt Spencer, (c. 1578 – 22 September 1598) was an Elizabethan actor. He is best known for episodes of violence culminating in his death in a duel at the hands of the playwright Ben Jonson.

== Acting career ==
Spenser appears in a number of documents as an actor associated with two of the major theatre companies of the day. Spenser first appears in records working for Francis Langley, in the Earl of Pembroke's Men, though he may have already been working for the Lord Chamberlain's Men. The stage direction "enter Gabriel" in the First Folio version of Shakespeare's Henry VI, Part 3 has often been thought to refer to Spenser's role in the play — that of a messenger. The names of actors are sometimes accidentally substituted for roles in published versions of plays. It has also been suggested that Spenser was the actor responsible for the so-called bad quarto of Romeo and Juliet published in 1597, if it was a memorial reconstruction.

In July 1597 Spenser was imprisoned after performing in The Isle of Dogs, an allegedly seditious play co-written by Ben Jonson and Thomas Nashe. It is not known why only Spenser and one other actor, Robert Shaw, were imprisoned, along with Jonson (Nashe fled London). The report of their arrest says that "the rest of the players or actors in that matter shall be apprehended", but no one else ever was. He was released after eight weeks.

In November of that year Spenser left the Earl of Pembroke's Men to join Philip Henslowe's company the Admiral's Men. Spenser joined as a shareholder, entitling him to a portion of the daily takings. Langley sued Spenser for breach of contract. In March 1598 Spenser appears in a document as a witness to a contract drawn up between Henslowe and Thomas Heywood.

== Killing of Feake ==
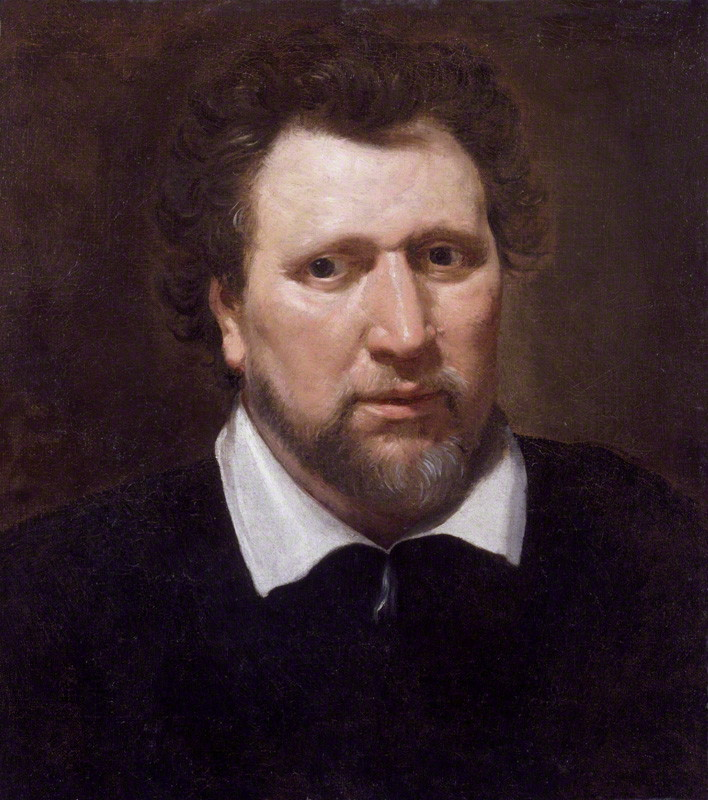
Ben Jonson, Spenser's killer.

In December 1596, while still a member of Langley's company, Spenser got into an argument with James Feake, the son of a goldsmith, at the house of a Shoreditch barber. It culminated with Spenser stabbing Feake with his sword, mortally wounding him. According to the inquest, the argument had escalated to the point that Feake attempted to throw a copper candelabrum at Spenser, who responded by attacking him with his still-sheathed sword, which penetrated his eye and entered his brain. Feake languished for three days before he died.

There is no record of any punishment meted out to Spenser, who may have successfully argued self-defence.

== Death ==
On 22 September 1598, Spenser fought a duel with Ben Jonson on Hoxton fields. The cause of the duel is not known. According to Jonson's account, related many years later, Spenser had initiated the duel and had the advantage of a much longer sword. Spenser wounded Jonson in the arm, but Jonson managed to strike back, killing him. The inquest says he died from a six-inch deep stab wound in his right side.

Jonson confessed to the killing, but escaped capital punishment by pleading benefit of clergy. He was sentenced to be branded on the thumb. During his imprisonment he converted to Roman Catholicism. Henslowe appears to have been very angry with Jonson and refused to produce his next play.

It has been suggested that Jonson's many enemies never subsequently taunted him as the murderer of Spenser because the latter was widely believed to have deserved his fate. However, Heywood appears to praise Spenser in his Apology for Actors, listing him with other deceased actors whose "deserts yet live in the remembrance of many".

Spenser was buried in St Leonard's, Shoreditch, which is also the resting place of several other Elizabethan actors. A memorial plaque was put up in 1913 by the London Shakespeare League to commemorate him and the others who rest there.
