= Porter's Hall Theatre =

Coordinates: 51.5119°N 0.1019°W

The Porter's Hall Theatre, Puddle Wharf Theatre or Rosseter's Theatre was a small theatre in London; it existed for a short while in 1615. The licence for its construction was revoked around its date of completion, and few records of it survive.

== Location ==
Porter's Hall Theatre was constructed at Puddle Wharf, Blackfriars, by Philip Rosseter, the manager of the Queen's Revels company, after he lost his lease on the nearby Whitefriars Theatre in 1614. It received a royal licence on 3 June 1615, allowing it to be used by the Queen's Revels, Prince Charles's Men and Lady Elizabeth's Men.

== History ==
Two impresarios associated with The Queen's Revels, Philip Henslowe and Edward Alleyn, offered finance to playwright Robert Daborne to build the structure within his father's private house. The opening performance was Beaumont and Fletcher's The Scornful Lady, transferred from Whitefriars. Nathan Field's Amends for Ladies was staged in late 1616 or early 1617; the title page of the printed edition of 1618 states: "As it was acted at the Blacke Fryers, both by the Princes Seruants, and the Lady Elizabeths"; this is a reference to Porter's Hall Theatre.

The City authorities, however, ordered the theatre to close and the building demolished. Neighbours opposed to the construction of another theatre (after their unsuccessful opposition to the neighbouring Blackfriars Theatre) gave a petition to Sir Edward Coke, Lord Chief Justice, in August 1615 and on 26 September it was ordered that the licence for the playhouse applied only to the suburbs and did not allow it to be constructed in the City itself, and that all building work must stop.

Legal arguments from Rosseter and his two fellow investors, Philip Kingman and Ralph Reeve, went back and forth until 27 January 1617, when the king gave his consent that the playhouse should be pulled down. By this time it would appear that construction of the theatre was completed.

== See also ==
- List of English Renaissance theatres
