= Pembroke's Men =

Late-16th-century English playing company

The Earl of Pembroke's Men was an Elizabethan era playing company, or troupe of actors, in English Renaissance theatre. They functioned under the patronage of Henry Herbert, 2nd Earl of Pembroke. Early and equivocal mentions of a Pembroke's company reach as far back as 1575; but the company is known for certain to have been in existence in 1592. In that year, a share in the company was valued at £80 (more than William Shakespeare would pay for New Place in Stratford-upon-Avon five years later).

== Shakespeare ==
Some think that Shakespeare spent time as both an actor and writer for Pembroke's Men in the early 1590s. Two of the earliest quarto publications of individual Shakespearean plays are both linked to this company: the title page of the earliest text of Henry VI, Part 3 (1595) states that the play was performed by Pembroke's Men, while the title page of Q1 of Titus Andronicus (1594) states that that play was acted by three companies, Pembroke's Men, Derby's Men, and Sussex's Men. The mention of three acting companies for one play is unusual; but the early 1590s were difficult years for the professional actors of the day. Severe epidemics of bubonic plague forced a halt to public performances in and around London; the actors' troupes toured the provinces, splintered and recombined, and generally did whatever was necessary to continue.

== Difficult years ==
The company that toured under Pembroke's patronage in 1592 is generally considered to have been formed by personnel from Lord Strange's Men and the Lord Admiral's Men, two companies that had been working together at Philip Henslowe's Rose Theatre in 1591. The tour lasted about ten months and was a financial failure. Their tour of 1593 featured 3 Henry VI; other plays in their repertory at the time were Christopher Marlowe's Edward II, and The Taming of a Shrew (a different version of the Shakespeare play known today). The 1593 tour was also a disappointment; a letter that Henslowe wrote to Edward Alleyn in September 1593 states that Pembroke's Men had been home from their tour for five of six weeks, and had had to pawn their costumes. The company's members struggled through, however; they were touring the provinces again in 1595 and 1596.

== The Isle of Dogs ==
Pembroke's Men achieved their one great peak of fame, notoriety, infamy in 1597. In February of that year they signed an exclusive contract with Francis Langley, to perform at his new Swan Theatre. Their standing roster was augmented by two actors from the Admiral's Men, Thomas Downton and Richard Jones. Their season began in the spring and early summer without incident, as far as is known; but in July 1597 they performed The Isle of Dogs, by Thomas Nashe and Ben Jonson. Something in this lost play (no copy survived its suppression) offended the Privy Council; in response to its "very seditious and scandalous matter," the Council ordered all the public theatres closed for the rest of the summer. Ben Jonson and two of the actors in the cast, Robert Shaw and Gabriel Spencer, were thrown into the Marshalsea prison till October 3; Thomas Nashe escaped only by fleeing to Great Yarmouth in Norfolk (not, as this is often confused, Yarmouth, which is on the Isle of Wight). The documents relating to the case specify that Jonson was not only a part-author of the play, but also a member of the cast — one of the few indications of Jonson's early career on the boards.

The other theatre companies in London were allowed to resume activity after the summer was over; but the Privy Council decided to punish Langley in particular (he was in trouble for additional, non-theatre-related causes), and kept the Swan closed. (Langley may have staged occasional performances despite the ban; but he was unable to resume regular performances, which would have provided a regular income for all concerned.) This presented the Pembroke's Men with a critical problem: they were legally bound to act only for Langley — but couldn't act for Langley. The company broke apart under the strain: Jones and Downton returned to the Admiral's, and three more Pembroke men, William Borne and the recently released Shaw and Spencer, followed them. (Spencer would be killed by Jonson in their famous duel a year later.) They appear to have taken some Pembroke's playscripts with them, titles that may have included a Dido and Aeneas, plus Hardicanute, Black Joan, Friar Spendleton, Alice Pierce, and others.

Langley sued over this breach of contract; but apparently he reached some kind of agreement with Henslowe, since the five actors stayed with Henslowe's company. The rump of Pembroke's Men, perhaps augmented with replacement recruits, toured the provinces from late 1597 through 1599. After two unsuccessful performances at the Rose Theatre in October 1600, the company disappears from history; some of its members may have joined Worcester's Men, a company that was re-forming at the time. Langley himself died a year after the company, in 1601.
