= Newington Butts Theatre =

Former 16th century theatre in London

Coordinates: 51.495°N 0.100°W

The Newington Butts Theatre was one of the earliest Elizabethan theatres, possibly predating even The Theatre of 1576 and the Curtain Theatre, which are usually regarded as the first playhouses built around London. William Ingram believes it was probably the first of the three to begin construction, and may have been the first completed.

== Establishment ==
The Mayor and Corporation of London banned plays in 1572 as a measure against the plague, and in 1575 they formally expelled all players from the city. This prompted the construction of playhouses outside the jurisdiction of London, in the liberties of Halliwell (in Shoreditch) and later the Clink, and at Newington near the established entertainment district of St. George's Fields. The Newington theatre was located not on Newington Butts itself, but nearby on the east side of Walworth Road near the junction with New Kent Road. The playhouse stood on less than an acre of land in Lurklane, occupying 48 yards (44 m) of frontage on what became Walworth Road and bounded to the south by a drainage ditch (or "sewer" in the language of the time). Ingram uses commission of sewers records of 1576–1578 to deduce that the actor Jerome Savage lived adjacent to the sewer and thus the playhouse was in the northern part of the plot. The Reliance Building used to occupy the site; it is now under the southern roundabout of the Elephant and Castle junction.

Lurklane was 10 acres (4.0 ha) out of 35 acres (14 ha) leased in 1566 from the Dean and Chapter of Canterbury Cathedral by Richard Hick(e)s. Hicks was a grocer and member of the royal retinue, sometimes described as a "yeoman of the guard". Hicks sublet Lurklane to Jerome Savage on or about Lady Day (25 March) 1576, some three weeks before the lease was signed for The Theatre in Shoreditch. However, soon after the 1576 lease was signed, Hicks and his son-in-law Peter Hunningborne tried to rescind it. They failed to do so through the courts, but used trickery to make Savage default on his rent on Lady Day 1577. Savage appears to have stayed on the premises, and in turn sought the protection of the law as Hunningborne sought to move into Savage's residence. Hunningborne described Savage as "a verrie lewed fealowe" who "liveth by noe other trade than playinge of staige plaies and Interlevdes". However the sewer assessments indicate that Savage remained on the premises, so the lawsuit may have been withdrawn or settled out of court.

Wickham et al interpret these documents to mean that Hicks constructed a 'house or tenement' that someone (presumably the actor Savage) converted into a playhouse. It was clearly established by Lady Day 1577 and like the Theatre may have been in use before the winter of 1576/77, or even in 1575. Savage may have built the theatre under the patronage of the Earl of Warwick whose company of actors first performed at court on 14 February 1575. Warwick had been appointed to the Privy Council in the autumn of 1573, and the more powerful privy councillors – the earls of Sussex, Lincoln, Arundel and his younger brother Robert Dudley, Earl of Leicester – were all patrons of playing companies.

== Success and decline ==
Warwick's company appears to have flourished for around five years, before ill-health forced him to retire to his home in Hertfordshire. On 13 May 1580 the Privy Council wrote to the Surrey justices about an unknown company playing at Newington Butts despite a ban on theatre. It is known that John and Lawrence Dutton led members of Warwick's company to reform as the Earl of Oxford's players by April 1580, and Ingram speculates that it was they who were playing at their old home. Oxford was sent to the Tower of London in 1581, banished from court until 1 June 1583 and went off to war in Flanders in 1585. John Dutton left for the newly formed Queen's Men in 1583 but Oxford's Men survived the loss of their leader, being recorded in each year 1584–1587 and leaving traces of activity thereafter.

A sewer record of 26 February 1591 refers to Hunningborne and the playhouse. By that time it seems to have been in decline, as more theatres sprung up closer to London. Some time in the early 1590s (and definitely before September 1593) Lord Strange's Men played three days there, but the undated Privy Council document comments on the inconvenience of its location and "of longe tyme plaies haue not there bene vsed on working daies". Plague closed down London's theatres for most of the period between 22 June 1592 and 14 May 1594. The impresario Philip Henslowe took the opportunity to remodel his Rose Theatre, but for some reason the Privy Council kept it closed from 16 May to 15 June 1594.

Accordingly, Henslowe promoted a series of plays at Newington Butts from 3–13 June 1594 with the Admiral's Men and Lord Chamberlain's Men, the two companies that had emerged from Lord Strange's men during the layoff. The nature of Henslowe's relationship with Newington Butts is uncertain, Vickers among others has suggested Henslowe owned it by this time but Wickham et al speculate that the poor profits he recorded for the season were in part due to the cost of renting the theatre. The ownership theory might be bolstered by Winifred Frazer's suggestion that the enigmatic abbreviation 'ne' used by Henslowe in his records of certain plays, conventionally taken to mean a new play, applies to a performance at Newington.

This season of plays in June 1594 is well documented, as Henslowe kept assiduous records in his "Diary". These include some of the earliest known performances of familiar names such as Hamlet, Titus Andronicus and The Taming of a Shrew but in each case the exact relationship between the 1594 plays and those we know as Shakespeare's is uncertain and controversial among scholars. Rutter regards the Titus put on by Henslowe at the Rose in January 1594 as "almost certainly Shakespeare's", but it is very early for the Hamlet of the Second Quarto and First Folio, which is ascribed to around 1600. This and other evidence has led to the theory that the 1600 text is based on an earlier play, the so-called "Ur-Hamlet", which was written by either Thomas Kyd, Shakespeare, or someone else. This performance is the first one on record of Ur-Hamlet, although it appears to have existed since at least 1589.

On 6 July 1594 the Dean and Chapter let the playhouse site to Paul Buck, on condition that he convert the playhouse to other uses and that no more plays were performed after Michaelmas (29 September). Buck seems to have complied – there is no mention of the playhouse in the renewal of his lease on 5 April 1595, and on 5 October 1599 the Sewer Commission refers to "the houses where the old playhouse did stand at Newington". The theatrical links lingered after the theatre was gone; a bad pun is referred to as a "Newington conceit" in a play of 1612 and the playwright Thomas Middleton died there and was buried at Newington Butts church on 4 July 1627.

== See also ==
- List of English Renaissance theatres
