= Robert Dawes (disambiguation) =

Robert Dawes was an English actor.

Robert Dawes may also refer to:

- Sir Robert Dawes (died 1690), second baronet of the Dawes baronets
- Bob Dawes (1924–2003), Canadian ice hockey defenceman
- Robert "Bobby" Dawes was a fictional candidate for Governor of Massachusetts in the tabletop roleplaying game Cyberpunk 2020

== See also ==
- Dawes (surname)
