= The Swan (theatre) =

Former theatre in London, England

Coordinates: 51°30′25″N 0°6′11″W

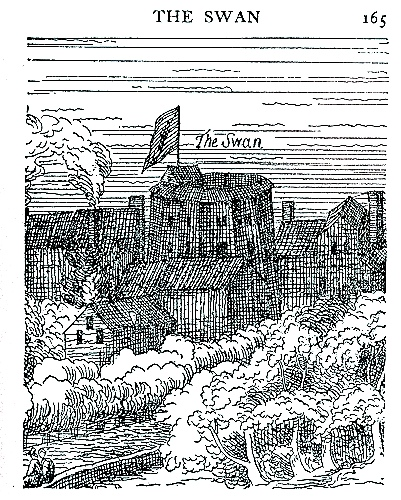
The exterior of the Swan Theatre: a redrawing of a detail from a panorama of London by Claes Van Visscher

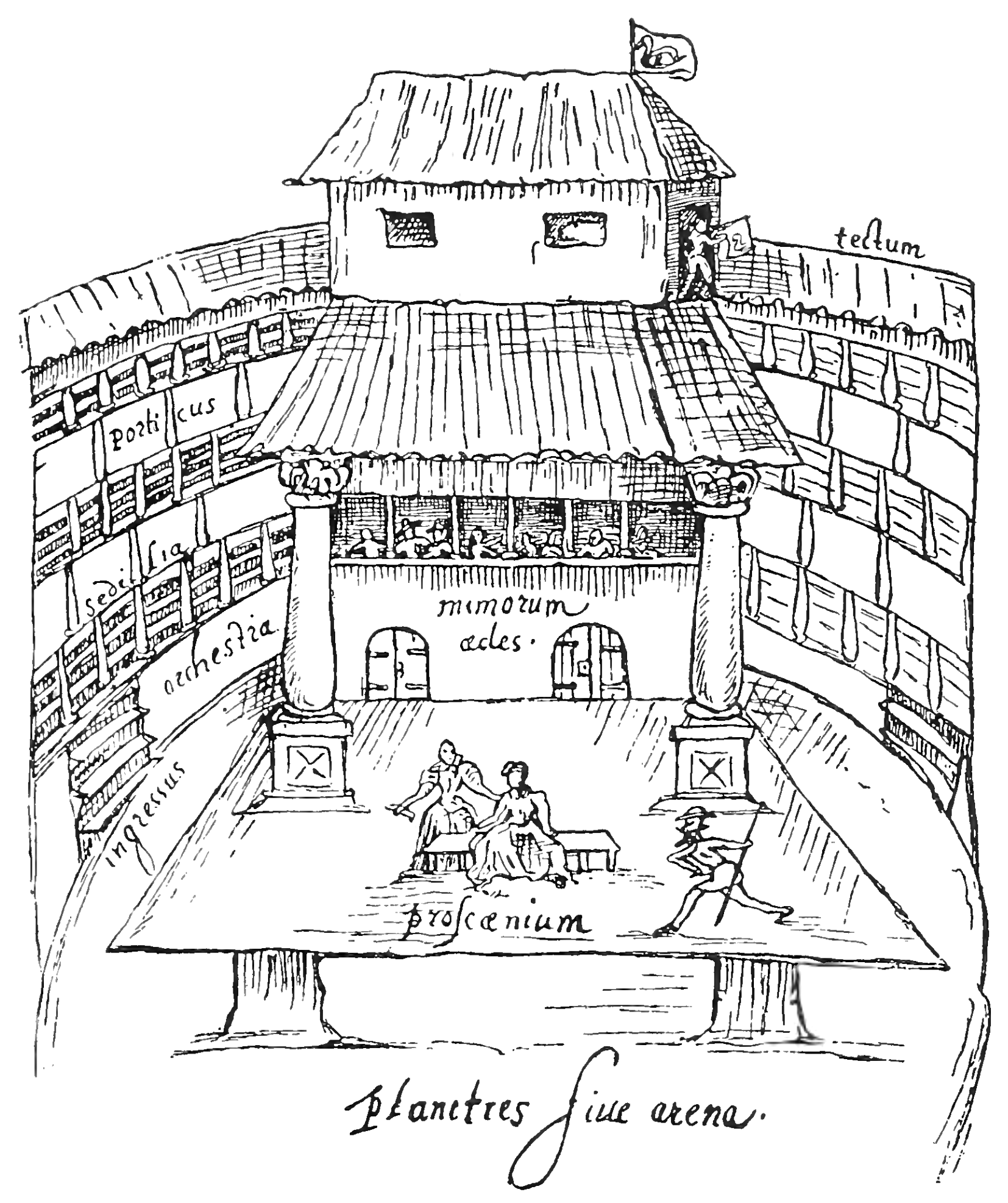
A 1595 sketch of a performance in progress on the thrust stage of the Swan

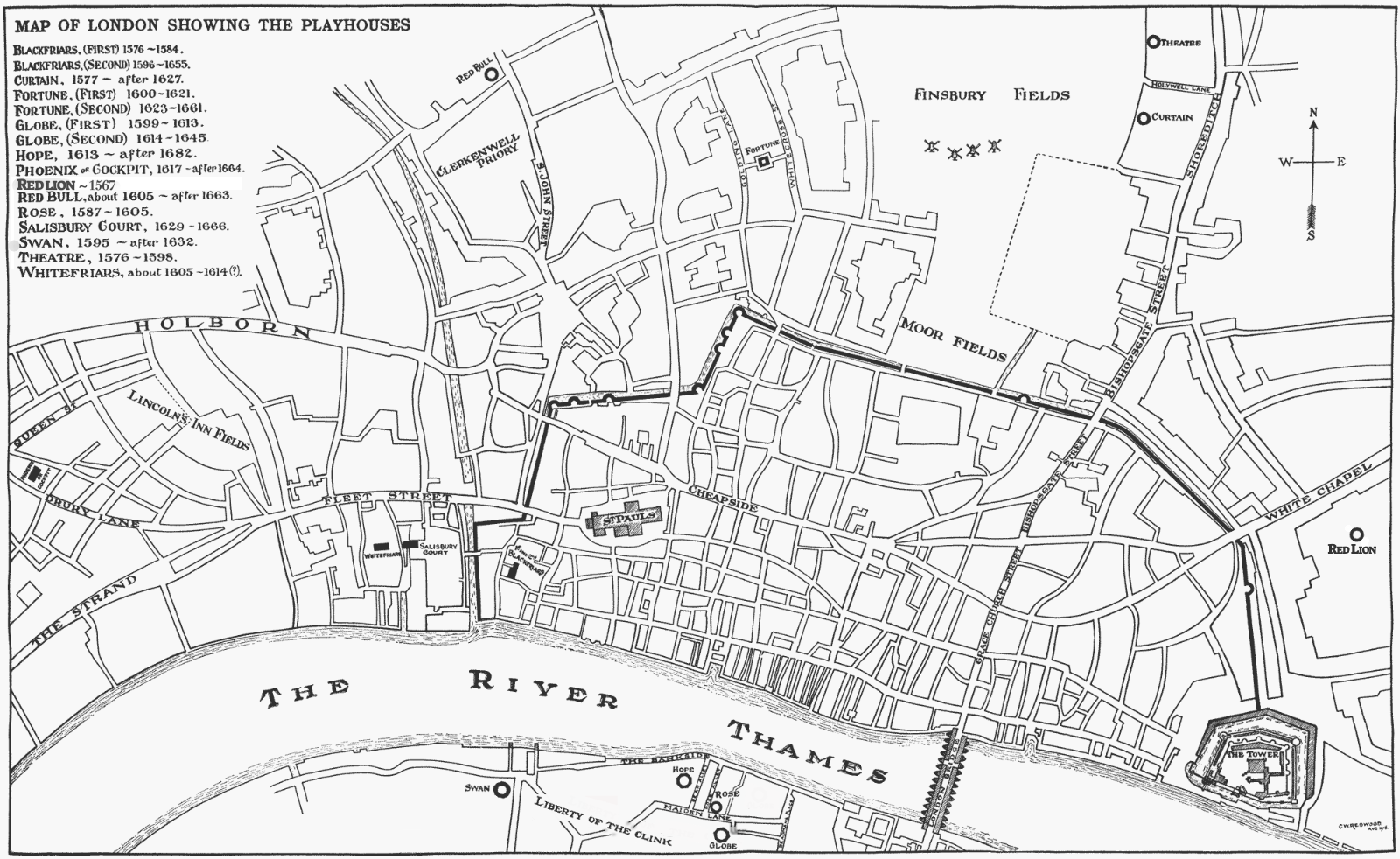
The Swan is labelled in the bottom centre of this London street map

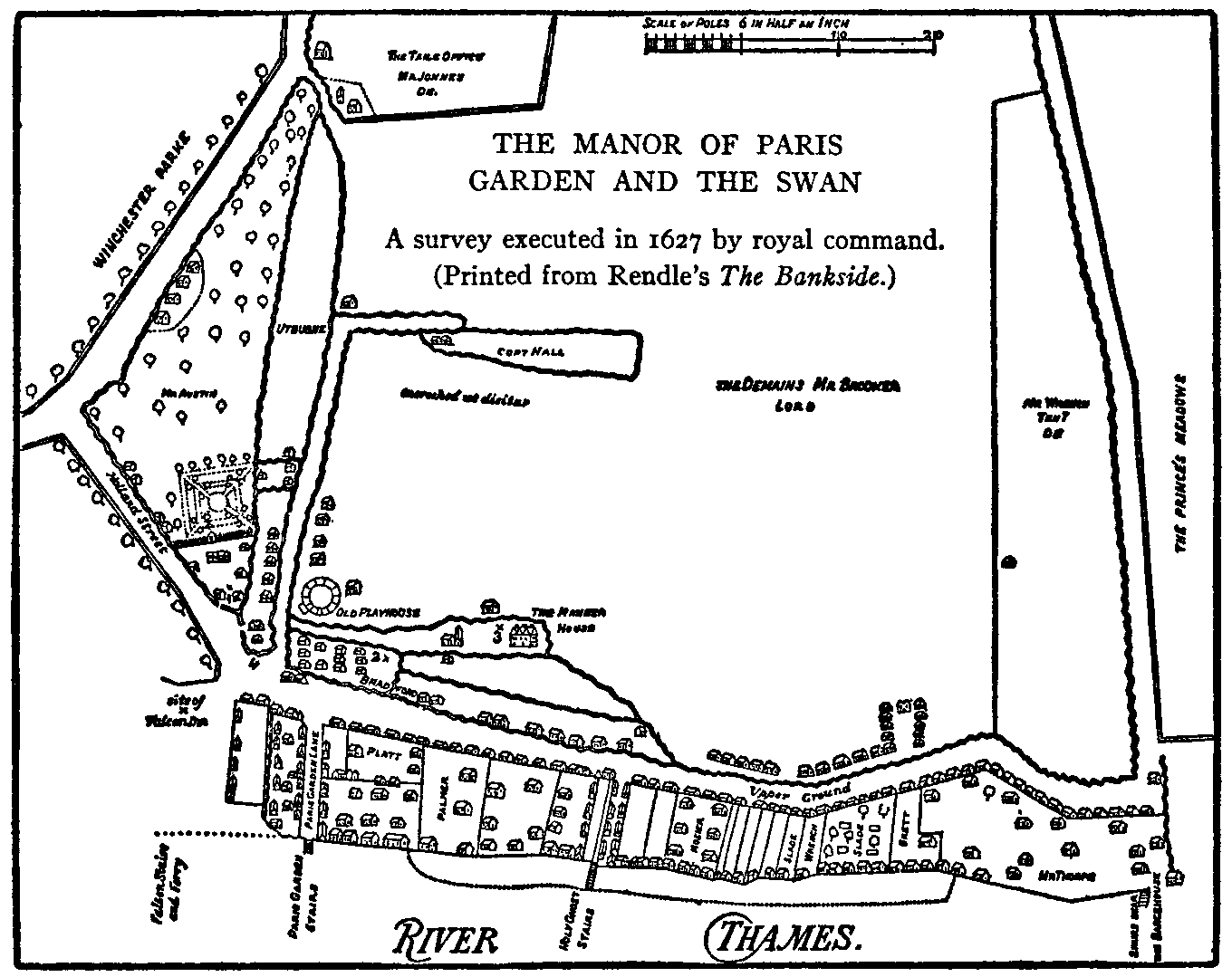
The Manor of Paris Gardens, Bankside, showing the location of The Swan. Enlarge

The Swan was a theatre in Southwark, London, England, built in 1595 on top of a previously standing structure, during the first half of William Shakespeare's career. It was the fifth in the series of large public playhouses of London, after James Burbage's The Theatre (1576) and Curtain (1577), the Newington Butts Theatre (between 1575 and 1577) and Philip Henslowe's Rose (1587–88).

The Swan Theatre was located in the manor of Paris Gardens, on the west end of the Bankside district of Southwark, across the Thames River from the City of London. It was at the northeast corner of the Paris Garden estate nearest to London Bridge that Francis Langley had purchased in May 1589 at a distance of four hundred and twenty-six feet from the river's edge. Playgoers could arrive also by water landing at the Paris Garden Stairs or the Falcon Stairs, both short walking distances from the theatre.

== Architecture ==
It was built of flint concrete, and its wooden supporting columns were so cleverly painted that "they would deceive the most acute observer into thinking that they were marble", giving the Swan a "Roman" appearance. When Henslowe built the new Hope Theatre in 1613, he had his carpenter copy the Swan, rather than his own original theatre, the Rose, which must have appeared dated and out of style in comparison.

== History ==
=== Construction ===
The structure originally belonged to the Monastery of Bermondsey. After the Dissolution of the Monasteries, it became royal property and passed through several hands before being sold to Francis Langley for £850. The Mayor of London opposed Langley's permit to open a theatre, but his protests held no ground as the property had formerly belonged to the crown and the Mayor had no jurisdiction.

Langley had the theatre built almost certainly in 1595–96. Johannes De Witt, a Dutchman who visited London around 1596, left a description of the Swan in a manuscript titled Observationes Londiniensis, now lost. Translated from the Latin, his description identifies the Swan as the "finest and biggest of the London amphitheatres", with a capacity for 3000 spectators. This conflicts with a reconstruction done in the 1990s, based on a copy of de Witt's sketches, which only accounted for 1000 spectators and additional space for 500 groundlings in the pit. The copies of his sketches, created by Aernout van Buchel, are the only sketches of an Elizabethan playhouse known to exist.

=== Pembroke's Men ===
In 1597, the Swan housed the acting company Pembroke's Men, with actors Richard Jones, Thomas Downtown, and William Bird. They joined the Pembroke troupe after leaving their positions in Lord Admiral's Men at the rival playhouse The Rose. In the same year, Pembroke's Men staged the infamous play The Isle of Dogs, by Thomas Nashe and Ben Jonson, the content of which gave offence, most likely for its "satirical" nature on the attack of some people high in authority. Jonson was imprisoned, along with Gabriel Spenser, an actor in the play, and Robert Shaa.

Langley, already in trouble with the Privy Council over matters unrelated to theatre, may have exacerbated his danger by allowing his company to stage the play after a royal order that all playing stop and all theatres be demolished. This order of the Privy Council called for all London Theatres to be "plucked down", but may have arisen because of Langley and the 'seditious, lewd play'. The other companies were under inhibition to stop playing. The Lord Chamberlain's Men went on tour to six areas of the south east and south west, and the Admiral's Men did not perform again at The Rose until the inhibition was lifted at the end of October.

Johnson was released from jail on October 3. Nashe however went on the run. All but the Swan Theatre were granted licences to perform. The Swan continued to operate without a licence until 19 February 1598, when the two licensed companies called attention to them. Following the scandal, the Swan only held sporadic performances. Another scandal rocked the Swan in 1602, when Richard Vennar advertised a new play, England's Joy, to be performed at the Swan on 6 November. Vennar claimed the play was a fantastical story in honour of Queen Elizabeth, and seats sold out quickly. However, the play was never performed. The townspeople were enraged and vandalised the theatre, and the theatre never seemed to recover its former popularity.

Because both court and city were interested in limiting the number of acting troupes in London, and because there was, consequently, a glut of large open-roof venues in the city, the Swan was only intermittently home to drama. Along with The Isle of Dogs, the most famous play to premiere there was Thomas Middleton's A Chaste Maid in Cheapside, performed by the newly merged Lady Elizabeth's Men in 1613. The theatre offered other popular entertainments, such as swashbuckling competitions and bear-baiting.

=== Desertion and decay ===
For the next eight years, the building was used occasionally for special entertainment. After 1615 the Swan was deserted for five years, but used again in 1621 by some actors who are unknown. They did not stay for long.

The building grew decrepit over the next two decades. In Nicholas Goodman's 1632 pamphlet Holland's Leaguer, the theatre is described as "now fallen into decay, and, like a dying swan, hangs her head and sings her own dirge." Historical sources do not mention the Swan after that date.

== See also ==
- List of English Renaissance theatres
