= List of English Renaissance theatres =

The following is a list of English Renaissance theatres, from the first theatres built in 1567, to their closure at the beginning of the English Civil War in 1642.

English Renaissance theatres were more commonly known by the term 'playhouses'. They can be divided into indoor playhouses (which were small and performed to high-paying audiences) and outdoor playhouses (large, partly open-air amphitheatres that charged lower prices).

== Outdoor playhouses ==
- The Boar's Head, Whitechapel
- The Curtain, Shoreditch
- The Fortune
- The Globe, Bankside
- The Hope, Bankside
- Newington Butts
- The Red Bull, Clerkenwell
- The Red Lion, Mile End
- The Rose, Bankside
- The Swan, Bankside
- The Theatre, Shoreditch

== Indoor playhouses ==
- Blackfriars Theatre (two sites, near to one another), Blackfriars Dominican priory, City of London
- The Cockpit-in-Court, part of the Palace of Whitehall
- Cockpit Theatre, later renamed to The Phoenix, Drury Lane
- Porter's Hall Theatre, or Puddle Wharf, Blackfriars
- Salisbury Court Theatre, off Fleet Street
- St. Paul's Theatre, St. Paul's Cathedral
- Whitefriars Theatre, off Fleet Street

== See also ==
- English Renaissance theatre
- Inn-yard theatre
- List of former theatres in London
- List of London venues
- Theatre of the United Kingdom
