= PPG 16 =

Planning Policy Guidance 16: Archaeology and Planning commonly abbreviated as PPG 16, was a document produced by the UK Government to advise local planning authorities in England and Wales on the treatment of archaeology within the planning process.

== Background ==
Unexpectedly, in 1989, Shakespeare's The Rose was found on a development site in London. This incident led to the publication of the guidance.

== Publication ==
The guidance was issued in November 1990.

== Content ==
The guidance identified archaeological remains as a "finite and non-renewable resource." The guidance stated that local authorities were not allowed to make agreements trading funding for archaeological investigations against obtaining planning permission in the future.

== Replacement ==
On 23 March 2010 the Government published 'Planning Policy Statement 5: Planning and the Historic Environment' replacing and cancelling PPG16 and PPG15 which had dealt with the rest of the historic environment.

== See also ==
- Planning policy guidance notes
- Town and country planning in the United Kingdom
