= Robert Dawes =

English actor

Robert Dawes (fl. 1610–1614) was an English actor of the Jacobean era. He is unique in the extant records of English Renaissance theatre, in that his individual employment contract with one of his acting companies has survived.

Dawes was an early and perhaps an original member and "sharer" (a partner who shared in the profits, rather than a hired man who worked for a wage) with Prince Charles's Men, from at least 1610 on. He remained with that company only until 1614, however, when he left for the Lady Elizabeth's Men. Dawes was admitted as a sharer in the Lady Elizabeth's troupe; his personal 3-year contract with managers Philip Henslowe and Jacob Meade, dated 7 April of that year, spells out a schedule of graduated penalties for minor and major infractions of the rules:

- If Dawes was late for a rehearsal, he had to pay a fine of "twelve pence," one shilling (1 s.).
- If he missed a rehearsal entirely, the fine was 2 s.
- If he was late for a performance, the fine rose to 3 s.
- If he was drunk at the start of a performance (in the judgement of four troupe members), the fine was 10 s.
- If he missed a performance with no adequate excuse, the fine rose to one pound (£1).
- And if he was found guilty of appropriating any of the company's expensive costumes or other property (as by wearing a costume outside the theatre), the fine was a hefty (almost astronomical) £40.

(As a comparison, William Shakespeare paid £60 for New Place, the largest house in Stratford-upon-Avon, in 1597.)

Since no other comparable contract for an actor of the period exists, scholars cannot be certain that the Dawes document is representative. Yet there is nothing in Dawes's career that suggests he was particularly unusual, so that his contract was probably within the range of what was normal and typical for the actors of the period.
