= Worcester's Men =

Acting company in Renaissance England

The Earl of Worcester's Men was an acting company in Renaissance England. An early formation of the company, wearing the livery of William Somerset, 3rd Earl of Worcester, is among the companies known to have toured the country in the mid-sixteenth century. A later iteration of the company toured through the 1580s and '90s; little is known about its activities, though in 1583 it included the sixteen-year-old Edward Alleyn, at the start of his illustrious career.

By the start of the seventeenth century, Edward Somerset, 4th Earl of Worcester was moving up into the higher levels of the late-Elizabethan social and political structure; in April 1601 he became the Queen's Master of the Horse. It was to add to his prestige that Worcester wanted to bring his players to London. Through the 1590s, only two companies of adult players, the Lord Chamberlain's Men and the Admiral's Men, had been officially allowed in London. Worcester was able to make his company the third, with a license of the Privy Council as of 31 March 1602. The company was initially supposed to play only at the Boar's Head Inn; but by August of that year they were negotiating with Philip Henslowe. Soon they were playing at his Rose Theatre, which the Admiral's Men had vacated when they moved to the Fortune in 1600. (Henslowe did business with the members of Worcester's Men as he had with the Admiral's: many company members were soon in debt to him for small loans.)

During their first year with Henslowe, Worcester's Men purchased a dozen plays from Henslowe's stable of regular house dramatists: Thomas Dekker, Wentworth Smith, John Day, Henry Chettle, Richard Hathwaye, and even a young John Webster. Most have not survived. The fee for a play was normally £6, sometimes a pound or two higher; Dekker got an extra 10 shillings for one of his solo works.

In this incarnation, Worcester's Men included, at one time or another, John Lowin, actor/playwright Thomas Heywood and the famous clown Will Kempe. Christopher Beeston joined Worcester's Men in August 1602, after leaving the Lord Chamberlain's Men; another player from that company, John Duke, made the same move sometime in 1602. And in the latter part of that year Worcester's absorbed Oxford's Men, another company that had previously been active mostly as a touring troupe. In February 1603 they played A Woman Killed with Kindness, often called Heywood's best play.

The troupe did not achieve a degree of success equal to that of the Lord Chamberlain's Men at the Globe or the Admiral's Men at the new Fortune; yet early in the reign of James I, the company received royal patronage and became Queen Anne's Men.
