= John a Kent and John a Cumber =

John a Kent and John a Cumber is a sixteenth-century English play by Anthony Munday. The precise dating of the play is unknown, although a holographic transcript (dated 1590 in another hand) exists and there is some evidence that it was being performed on stage as early as 1587. The play is sometimes identified with The Wise Man of Westchester.

The precise dating of the play is important for two reasons: this play may be the earliest surviving original work of Munday, and, secondly because of the parallels that exist between this play and Shakespeare's Midsummer Night's Dream. Arguably the title (and the character names therein) might alternatively be taken to imply, and modernize as, John o' Kent and John a' Cumber (Cumberland having been a Scottish possession up to the twelfth century), in which case the geography of the play would also embrace those two counties. The text gives no firm indication that the two Johns do indeed come from these places, and John a Kent was also the name of a fifteenth-century Welsh bard.
