= Admiral's Men =

16th/17th-century English playing company

The Admiral's Men (also called the Admiral's company, more strictly, the Earl of Nottingham's Men; after 1603, Prince Henry's Men; after 1612, the Elector Palatine's Men or the Palsgrave's Men) was a playing company or troupe of actors in the Elizabethan and Stuart eras. It is generally considered the second most important acting troupe of English Renaissance theatre (after the company of Shakespeare, the Lord Chamberlain's or King's Men).

== Beginnings ==
They were first known as the Lord Howard's Men, named after their patron Charles Howard, 1st Earl of Nottingham. The company played once at Court on December 1576 (the play was called Tooley), again on 17 February 1577 (The Solitary Knight), and a third time the following Christmas season, 5 January 1578 (all dates new style). They toured widely, from Bath to Nottingham, in the years 1577–79.

A powerful patron like Howard could make a great difference in a company's fortunes. Though there is little evidence that he was actively concerned with drama, Howard was almost alone among Elizabeth's closest councillors in opposing the Lord Mayor of London's 1584 drive to close the public theatres. The theatres stayed open.

When Howard became England's Lord High Admiral in 1585, the group's name was changed to reflect his new title. They performed regularly in the provinces and at Court in the 1585–87 period; but a fatal accident at one of their performances forced them into a temporary retirement. (During a performance in London on 16 November 1587, stage gunfire went wrong, killing a child and a pregnant woman.) But they returned to activity with two performances at Court in the winter of 1588–9, on 29 December and 11 February.

Despite the power of their patron, the Admiral's Men were not entirely free of official interference. Both they and the Lord Strange's Men were stopped from playing by the Lord Mayor of London in November 1589; it seems that Edmund Tilney, the Master of the Revels, had taken a dislike to their choice of plays. During this period of difficulty the Admiral's Men moved into James Burbage's The Theatre for a time (November 1590 to May 1591), and there they played Dead Man's Fortune with a young Richard Burbage in the cast – the only time that the later competitors Burbage and Edward Alleyn, the longtime star of the Admiral's, are known to have acted together.

If the Admiral's Men were having difficulties in the city in this period, they were still welcome at Court (28 December 1589; 30 March 1590), and still popular in the towns and shires, where they toured more in 1589–90. Indeed, this was perhaps the height of their achievement: in these years Alleyn was making a sensation acting the heroes of Christopher Marlowe. Tamburlaine was printed in 1590 with their name on its title page. Some of the plays of Robert Greene, and Thomas Lodge's The Wounds of Civil War, were also in their repertory in the early 1590s.

== Henslowe years ==
It was during the later 1580s that the company established its long-term relationship with Philip Henslowe, theatre builder, producer, impresario. Henslowe's Rose Theatre was home to the Admiral's Men for a number of years, and Henslowe played a key role as a blend of manager and financier. After the major disruption of the 1592–94 era, when the public theatres endured a long closure due to bubonic plague, the Admiral's Men entered another lush period in 1594 and after.

The re-constituted company resumed performances on 14 May 1594, with The Jew of Malta and two anonymous and lost plays, The Ranger's Comedy and Cutlack. The Admiral's Men had Edward Alleyn as their leading man; other personnel included George Attewell, Thomas Downton, and James Tunstall, all veterans of the earlier pre-1592 version of the Admiral's, and Richard Jones, a former mate of Alleyn's and Tunstall's in Worcester's Men in the 1580s. (Jones and Downton would defect to Pembroke's Men in early 1597, only to be caught up in their disastrous performance of The Isle of Dogs, and return to the Admiral's by the end of that year.) Attewell was a "jigging" clown, known for his dancing; when Richard Tarlton had died in 1588, Attewell had taken over the job of dancing a jig at the end of each performance of the Queen Elizabeth's Men. John Singer, another clown with the Queen Elizabeth's company, also joined the Admiral's in 1594; other members included Edward Juby, Martin Slater, and Thomas Towne. The company's repertory came to feature plays by George Chapman, William Haughton, and Anthony Munday, among many other poets.

The survival of Henslowe's so-called Diary (actually an account book kept by Henslowe and others in his organization) provides scholars with more detailed information about the Admiral's Men in this era than is available for any contemporaneous acting troupe. Among other points, the Diary illustrates the enormous demands the Elizabethan repertory system placed upon the actors. In the 1594–95 season, the Admiral's Men generally performed six days a week, and staged a total of 38 plays; 21 of these were new plays, introduced at a rate of approximately one every two weeks – but only eight were acted again in subsequent seasons. The next season, 1595–96, demanded 37 plays, including 19 new ones; and the following year, 1596–97, 34 plays, 14 new. The company consistently played the works of Marlowe throughout this era. Tamburlaine Part 1 was acted 14 times in the 1594–95 season, followed by Doctor Faustus (12 performances), The Massacre at Paris (10), The Jew of Malta (9), and Tamburlaine Part 2 (6). Taken altogether, the most popular play over this 1594–97 period was the anonymous The Wise Man of Westchester, which has not survived yet was acted 32 times over the three years, debuting on 3 December 1594 and last played on 18 July 1597. Earlier scholars speculated that it might be an alternative title for Anthony Munday's John a Kent and John a Cumber, though no firm evidence supports this idea.

Henslowe had interests in other theatres, including the Fortune Theatre (built in 1600); the Admiral's Men moved into the new venue, and when the lease ran out on The Rose in 1605 it was abandoned. The company prospered, at least moderately, in its new location: in 1600 a share in the Admiral's Men (one out of a total of ten) was worth £50, while in 1613 a share (one of twelve) was valued at £70.

Sometime in the winter of 1603–4, after the House of Stuart succeeded to the throne of England, the Admiral's Men acquired a new patron, Prince Henry (1594–1612), later the Prince of Wales (1610–12). Edward Alleyn retired from the stage in 1604, though he was involved with the company as their Fortune Theatre landlord. During this period their core cohort of players consisted of William Bird, Thomas Towne, Samuel Rowley, Charles Massey, Humphrey and Anthony Jeffes, Edward Juby, and Thomas Downton (who had been part of the 1597 production of The Isle of Dogs). Edward Juby was the company's payee for Court performances, which suggests that he had significant responsibility for the troupe's finances.

The company was known as Prince Henry's Men until the Henry's early death (6 November 1612), after which they came under the patronage of his new brother-in-law, Frederick V, Elector Palatine. Their new patent of 11 January 1613 lists six of the actors of the previous decade, Juby, Bird, Rowley, Massey, Downton, and Humphrey Jeffes, plus six new sharers, who included John Shank, later a long-time member of the King's Men, and Richard Gunnell, who would become a theatre manager and impresario by building the Salisbury Court Theatre with William Blagrave in 1629.

== Decline ==
The company suffered a major set disaster when the Fortune Theatre burned down on 9 December 1621, destroying their stocks of playscripts and costumes. The owner, Edward Alleyn, rebuilt it in 1623, in brick, at a cost of £1000. The actors moved back in, though recovery was difficult. They persisted for years, but endured a long-term decline in reputation. The company finally collapsed in 1631; after a re-organization, a troupe with some of the same personnel received royal patronage under the name of the infant Prince Charles, the future Charles II, and became the second iteration of Prince Charles's Men at the Salisbury Court Theatre. In December 1631 the Fortune Theatre, vacated by the Admiral's/Palsgrave's company, received the King's Revels Men from the Salisbury Court for the next few years (1631–33).

== Repertory ==
The Admiral's Men acted a huge repertory of plays during their long career; Henslowe's Diary lists dozens from the 1597–1603 period alone. Most of these plays have not survived; they exist only as titles (sometimes provocative titles, like The Boss of Billingsgate, or Mahomet, or Judas). The list that follows is a selection of noteworthy surviving plays.

- The Blind Beggar of Alexandria, George Chapman, 1596
- An Humorous Day's Mirth, George Chapman, 1597
- The Downfall and The Death of Robert Earl of Huntington, Anthony Munday and Henry Chettle, 1598
- Englishmen for My Money, William Haughton, 1598
- The Shoemaker's Holiday, Thomas Dekker, 1599
- Sir John Oldcastle, Munday, Robert Wilson, Richard Hathwaye, and Michael Drayton, 1599
- The Honest Whore, Part 1, Dekker and Thomas Middleton, 1604
- When You See Me You Know Me, Samuel Rowley, 1605
- The Whore of Babylon, Dekker, 1607
- The Roaring Girl, Dekker and Middleton, 1611
