= The Isle of Dogs (play) =

Lost 1597 play by Thomas Nashe and Ben Jonson

The Isle of Dogs is a play by Thomas Nashe and Ben Jonson which was performed in 1597. It was immediately suppressed, and no copy of it is known to exist.

== The play ==
The play was performed, probably by Pembroke's Men, at the Swan Theatre in Bankside in the last week of July 1597. A satirical comedy, it was reported to the authorities as a "lewd plaie" full of seditious and "slanderous matter". While extant records do not indicate what gave offence, a reference in The Returne from Parnassus (II) suggests that Queen Elizabeth I herself was satirised. Other evidence suggests that Henry Brooke, 11th Baron Cobham was the target.

The Isle of Dogs is a location in London on the opposite bank of the Thames to Greenwich, home of a royal palace, Placentia, where indeed the Privy Council met. It was also believed to be where the queen kennelled her dogs, hence the name. David Riggs suggests that the satire might have been related to portrayal of the queen's councillors as lapdogs. However, the title alone does not indicate the play's content, since this area was also known as an unhealthy swamp where river sewage would accumulate. The Isle is also mentioned in Eastward Hoe (1605), another play for which Jonson was arrested. Nashe also referred to the location in Summer's Last Will and Testament: "Here's a coyle about dogges without wit. If I had thought the ship of fooles would have stayed to take in fresh water at the Ile of dogges I would have furnished it with a whole kennel of collections to the purpose."

== The punishment ==
Whatever the cause, Richard Topcliffe informed Robert Cecil, who raised the issue to the Privy Council on July 28. Three of the players (Gabriel Spenser, Robert Shaw, and Ben Jonson) were arrested and sent to Marshalsea Prison. Nashe's home was raided (he was then at Great Yarmouth) and his papers seized, but he escaped imprisonment. He later wrote that he had given birth to a monster – "it was no sooner borne but I was glad to runne from it." Nashe was later to call it "an imperfit Embrion of my idle houres" and claimed to have written only the introduction and first act. For his part, Jonson recalled that he said nothing but "yes and no". Authorities placed two informers (Robert Poley and someone surnamed Parrot) with him; those two are referred to in his Epigram 59, Of Spies.

After this burst of repression, royal authorities appear to have let the matter drop without further incident. The report of the initial arrest says that "the rest of the players or actors in that matter shall be apprehended", but no one else ever was. Shaw and Spenser were released quickly, and even Jonson was out of jail by early in October. Pembroke's Men were in action again, as were the other companies, before winter of that year. The only party permanently hurt was the Swan's impresario Francis Langley, who alone among the play's producers was not able to obtain relicensing. Langley had apparently run afoul of the Privy Council on an unrelated matter involving a large Portuguese diamond that Langley had fenced, or planned to fence.

== The incident and the London play-world ==
The suppression of Isle of Dogs has long been understood as a significant episode in the complex relations of city, court, and theatre worlds; its precise significance, however, is difficult to determine. E. K. Chambers, while noting Langley's diamond involvement, viewed the play as related to the Privy Council's 28 July order prohibiting acting and ordering that the theatres be "plucked down"; in this view, the leniency shown to the companies later in the year reflects the transient nature of the offence. Others, among them William Ingram, have questioned this chronology. The 28 July order does not mention the play; it was written in response to one of the city authorities' periodic pleas for an end to the theatres. The Council issued specific orders against the play in the next month. In this light, Pembroke's men may have made their offence worse by performing the play (wittingly or not) after the date of prohibition. Moreover, Cecil's anger over the stolen diamond may suggest that Langley was the sole target of the July injunction. Andrew Gurr adds to this picture by noting the tendency of the Court to license two chief companies throughout the later Elizabethan and early Stuart periods.

== Later references ==
The image of The Isle of Dogs conjured up a society ruined by envy, and Nashe also refers to Sirius the dog star in Summer's Last Will and Testament in relation to the dog days of July. Richard Lichfield was to taunt Nashe with this in his The Trimming of Thomas Nash Gentleman.

In modern writing, the novel D.O.G.S by M. A. Bennett references The Isle of Dogs, becoming a major part of the series.

== Sources ==
- Chambers, E. K. The Elizabethan Stage. 4 Volumes. Oxford: Clarendon Press, 1923.
- Gurr, Andrew. The Shakespearean Stage, 1574–1642. 2nd ed.; Cambridge: Cambridge University Press, 1992.
- Ingram, William. "The Closing of the Theaters in 1597: A Dissenting View." Modern Philology 69 (1971), pp. 105–115.
- Scoufos, Alice. "Nashe, Jonson, and the Oldcastle Problem." Modern Philology 65 (1968), pp. 307–324.
- Teramura, Misha. "Richard Topcliffe's Informant: New Light on The Isle of Dogs." The Review of English Studies 68 (2017), pp. 44–59.
