= The Rose (theatre) =

Elizabethan theatre in London

Coordinates: 51°30′26″N 0°05′44″W

The Rose was an Elizabethan playhouse, built by theatre entrepreneur Philip Henslowe in 1587. It was the fifth public playhouse to be built in London, after the Red Lion in Whitechapel (1567), The Theatre (1576) and the Curtain (1577), both in Shoreditch, and the theatre at Newington Butts (c. 1580?) – and the first of several playhouses to be situated in Bankside, Southwark, in a liberty outside the jurisdiction of the City of London's civic authorities. Two of the earliest plays by William Shakespeare – Titus Andronicus and Henry VI, Part 1 – are recorded as having been performed there, as well as plays by dramatists such as Christopher Marlowe, Thomas Kyd, Robert Greene, George Peele, Thomas Dekker, Michael Drayton, Ben Jonson and Thomas Heywood. The Rose's archaeological remains were rediscovered in 1989 during the redevelopment of the site to build an office block, and were partially excavated. After a public campaign to preserve the remains, they are now listed by Historic England as a Scheduled Monument at Risk. Subsequently, the site has become an exhibition space and theatre venue, known as The Rose Playhouse, administered by The Rose Theatre Trust, a registered charity, which plans to first complete the excavation and preservation of the remains, and then to build a new visitor, education and arts centre there.

== History ==
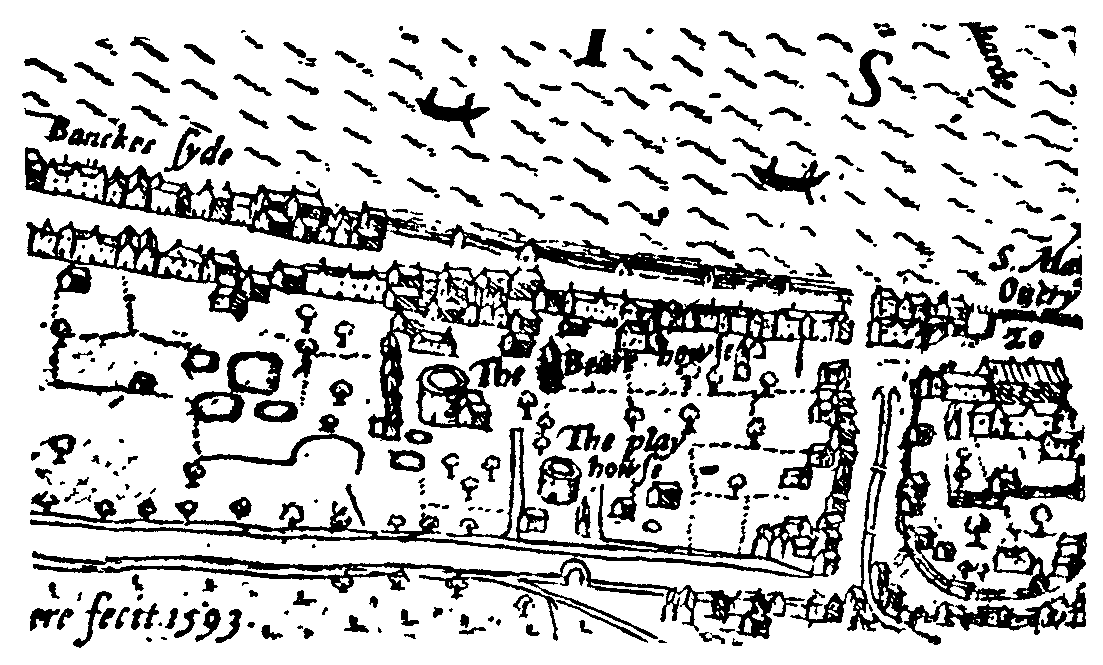
1593 map showing The Rose (labelled The play howſe) in relation to the Beargarden (labelled The Bear howſe) on Bankside

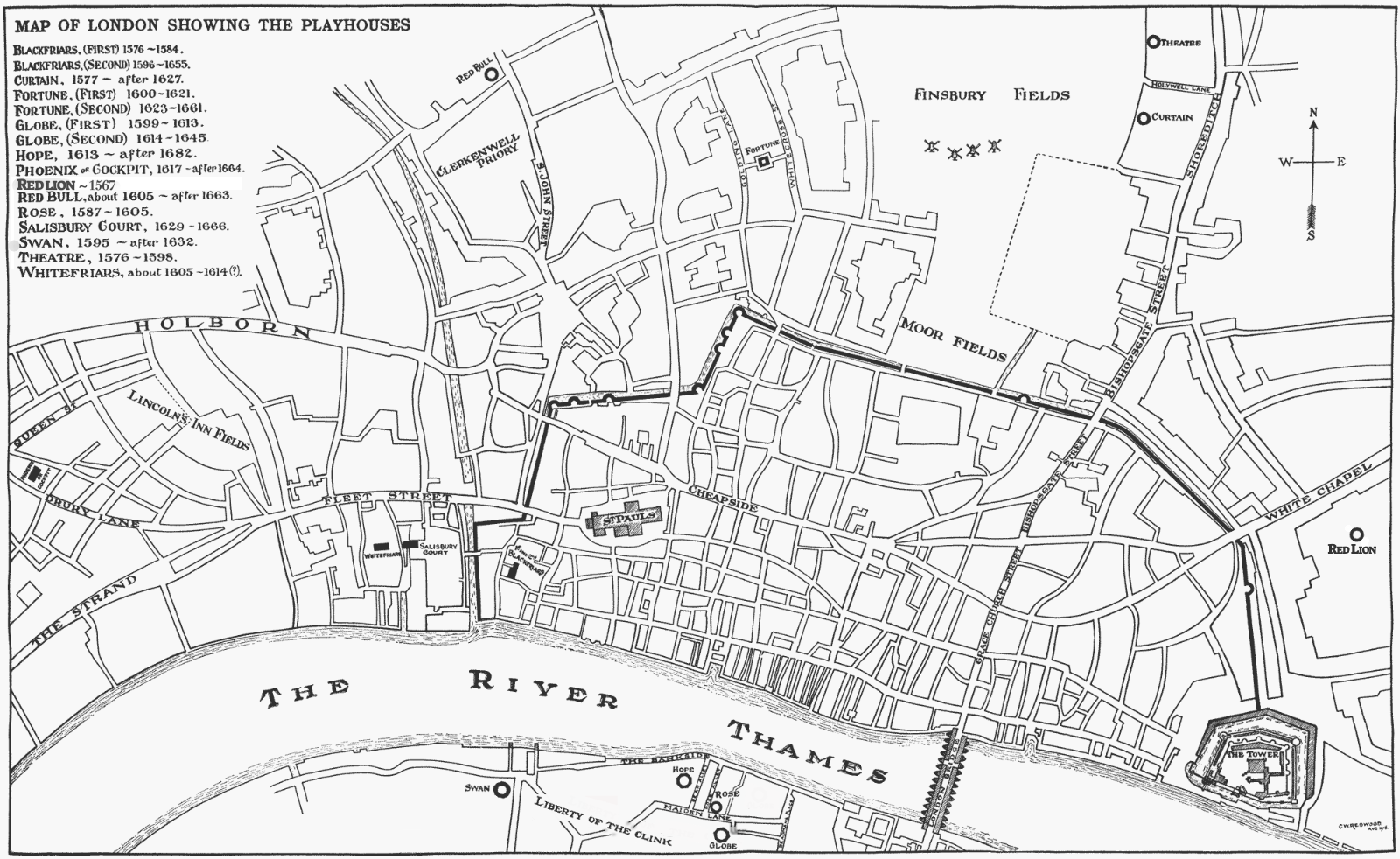
London street map: The Rose is at bottom centre

The Rose was built in 1587 by Philip Henslowe and by a tanner from Bletchingley named John Cholmley. The theatre was built on a messuage called the "Little Rose," which Henslowe had leased from the parish of St. Saviour, Southwark in 1585. The Rose was the first of several theatres to be situated in Bankside, Southwark near the south shore of the River Thames. The area was known for its leisure attractions such as bear/bull-baitings, gaming dens and brothels. It was located in the Liberty of the Clink, a liberty outside the jurisdiction of the City of London's civic authorities. The Rose contained substantial rose gardens and two buildings; Cholmley used one as a storehouse, while Henslowe appears to have leased the other as a brothel. North of London, professional playhouses like the Curtain Theatre and The Theatre had already been open for over a decade. However, Henslowe recognized the ease at which audiences could ferry across the River of Thames and established a playhouse in this particular location.

The extent of Cholmley's involvement in the theatre project is unclear. The only mention of Cholmley among Henslowe's diaries of the playhouse are in the deed of partnership between the two men, and in brief scribbles on the outside cover of the first folio: "Cholmley Cholmley" and "Cholmley when?". Cholmley died in 1589, nullifying their deed of partnership only two years into the agreed eight year and three-month term. Cholmley was a member of the Worshipful Company of Grocers and so is referred to as a Grocer in some sources, though his primary business was in tanning.

The theatre was built by the carpenter John Griggs. The new building was of timber, with a lath and plaster exterior and thatch roof. In shape it was a fourteen-sided polygon, of about 72 feet (22 m) in external diameter. The inner space was also a fourteen-sided polygon, about 47 feet (14 m) wide. Modern calculations show that the dimensions and fourteen-sided layout were dictated by the use of the standard 16th-century measure of one rod as a base and the carpenter's "rule of thumb" method of dividing a circle into seven equal parts, subdivided.

Henslowe's documentation of the Rose Theatre has survived, deposited at the College of God's Gift, Dulwich, (now in the archives at Dulwich College) by its founder, Edward Alleyn, in 1619. Alleyn was the principal actor of the Lord Admiral's Men. City records indicate that The Rose was in use by late 1587; however, it is not mentioned in Henslowe's accounts between its construction and 1592, and it is possible that he leased it to an acting company with which he was not otherwise concerned. In May 1591, The Lord Admiral's Men split off from the Lord Chamberlain's Men, a company of London's most famous actor, Richard Burbage, at The Theatre. Their repertoire included plays by Robert Greene and especially Christopher Marlowe, who became the theatre's main playwright. Edward Alleyn married Henslowe's step-daughter in 1592, and the two became partners. However, the 1592–4 period was difficult for the acting companies of London; a severe outbreak of bubonic plague meant that the London theatres were closed almost continuously from June 1592 to May 1594. The plague took nearly 11,000 Londoners. The companies were forced to tour to survive, and some, like Pembroke's Men, fell on hard times. From 1592 to 1593, the Lord Strange's Men performed on the Rose Stage. From 1593 to 1594, the Earl of Sussex's Men performed in its place, suggesting that the Lord Strange's Men were among the deceased. By the summer of 1594 the plague had abated, and the companies re-organized themselves. The Queen's Men performed in 1594 and the Lord Admiral's Men, still led by Alleyn, resumed its place at the Rose by the spring. At their height, in the year from June 1595, they performed 300 times, nearly thirty-six plays, twenty of which were new. The Lord Admiral's Men resided at The Rose for seven years.

Henslowe enlarged the theatre for The Lord Admiral's Men, moving the stage further back (six feet six inches, or two metres) to make room for perhaps 500 extra spectators. The original Rose was smaller than other theatres, only about two-thirds the size of the original Theatre built eleven years earlier, and its stage was also unusually small; the enlargement addressed both matters. Henslowe paid all the costs himself, given Cholmley was deceased. The renovation gave the theatre, formerly a regular polygon with fourteen sides, a distorted egg-shaped floor plan known as a "bulging tulip" or "distorted ovoid".

However, the Rose's success encouraged other theatre companies to set up roots in the Bankside. The Swan Playhouse opened nearby in the winter of 1596. People were drawn to the comedies and tragedies performed at the Swan in contrast to the history plays for which the Rose Theatre was renowned. In 1598, Alleyn retired, and Henslowe shifted his position over from landlord and banker to the full financial manager. When the Lord Chamberlain's Men built the Globe Theatre on the Bankside in 1599, however, the Rose was put into a difficult position. In January the following year, Henslowe and Alleyn built The Fortune Theatre north of the River of Thames. Prompted by complaints from city officials, the Privy Council decreed in June 1600 that only two theatres would be allowed for stage plays: The Globe Theatre in Bankside, and the Fortune Theatre in Middlesex – specifically, Shoreditch. Henslowe and Alleyn had already built the Fortune, apparently to fill the vacuum created when the Chamberlain's Men left Shoreditch. The Rose was used briefly by The Lord Pembroke's Men in 1600 and the Worcester's Men in 1602 and 1603. The lease ended in 1605, and Henslowe was ready to renew his lease under the original terms. However, the parish insisted on renegotiating the contract and tripled the price of his rent. Henslowe gave up the playhouse in 1605. The Rose may have been torn down as early as 1606. Henslowe moved on to build the Hope Theatre in 1613. He died three years later.

The Rose appears to have differed from other theatres of the era in its ability to stage large scenes on two levels. It is thought that all Elizabethan theatres had a limited capability to stage scenes "aloft," on an upper level at the back of the stage – as with Juliet at her window in Romeo and Juliet, II.ii. A minority of Elizabethan plays, however, call for larger assemblies of actors on the higher second level – as with the Roman Senators looking down upon Titus in the opening scene of Titus Andronicus. An unusual concentration of plays with the latter sort of staging requirement can be associated with the Rose, indicating that the Rose had an enhanced capacity for this particularity of stagecraft.

== Excavation ==
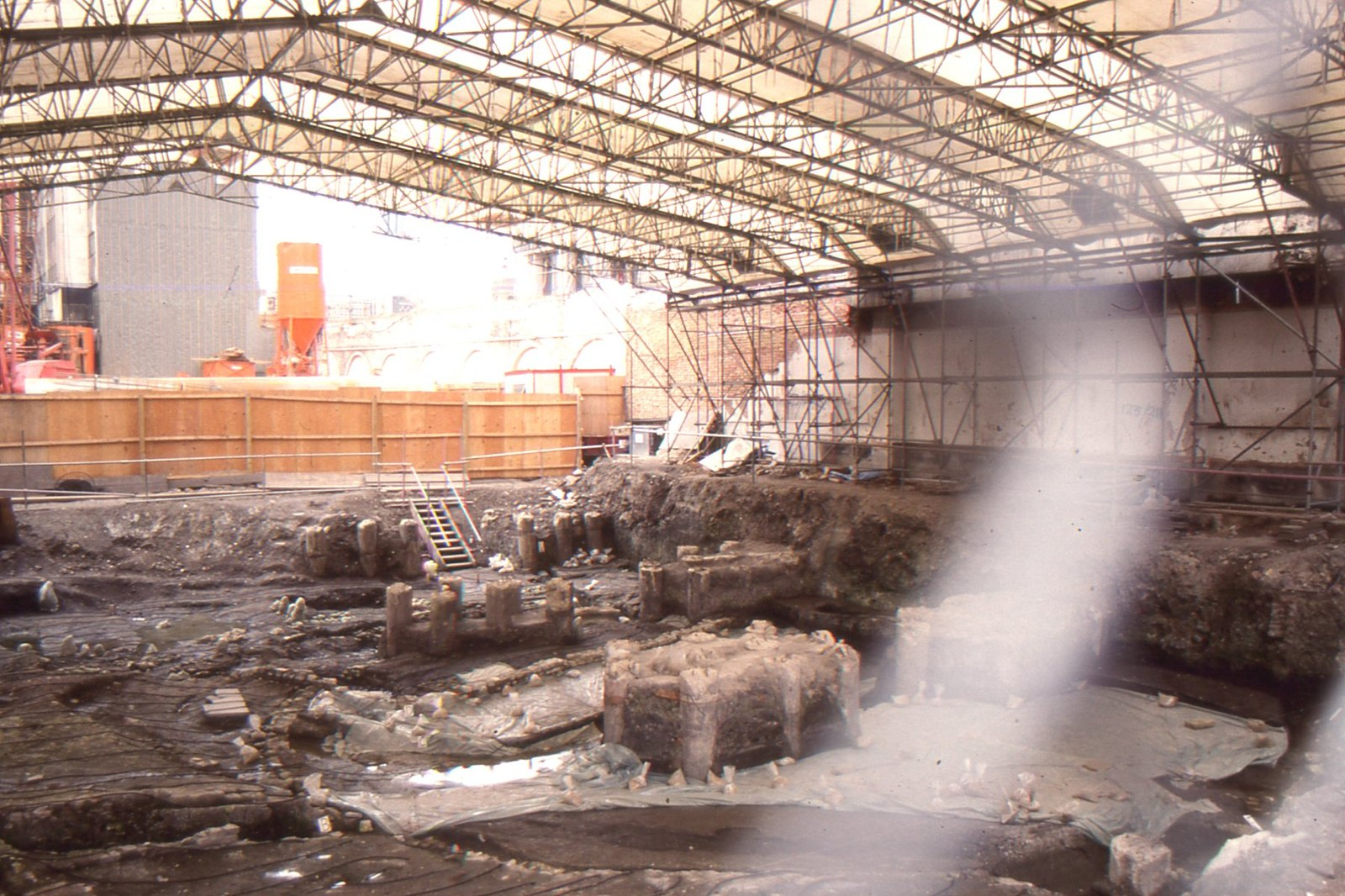
During 1989 excavation

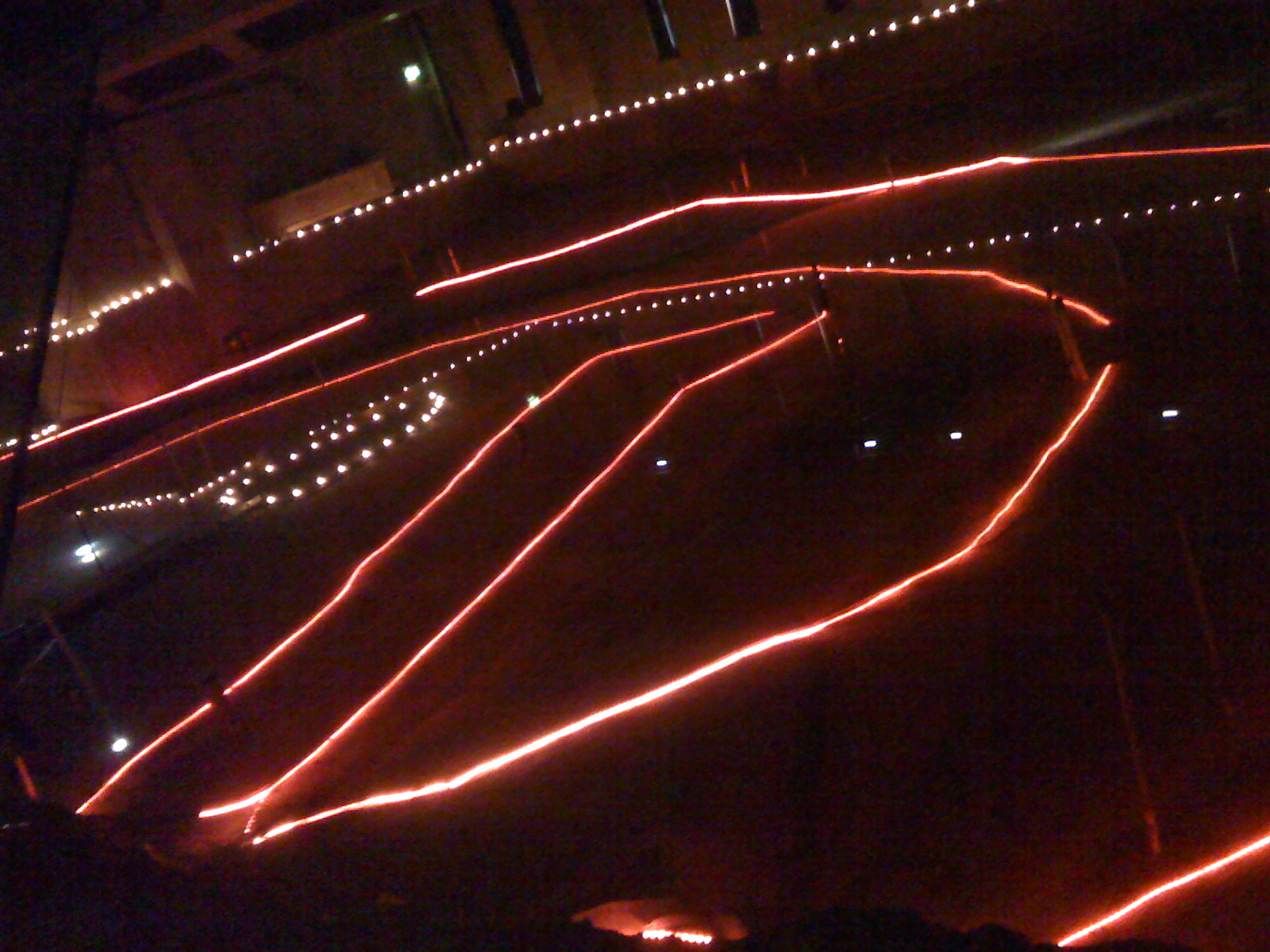
The position of the foundations was outlined for display to the public in 1999

An archaeological dig began in Park Street during planned large scale redevelopment. Investigatory trenches revealed several finds, which came to the attention of Sam Wanamaker, who was seeking the means to recreate Shakespeare's Globe Theatre, and conveying updates to his contacts in theatrical productions early in 1988. An action committee was formed to 'Save The Rose Theatre', being assisted by both 'Entertainment Stars and a rotation of public volunteers, to ensure the site's protection, which was continually threatened by construction crews ignorant of the potential 'English Heritage' beneath.

In March 1989, the remains of The Rose were again threatened with destruction resulting in a physical stand-off between the two parties at the entrance of the building development. A campaign to save the site was launched by several well-known theatrical figures, led by Peggy Ashcroft and including Laurence Olivier and Judi Dench. Prior to the site being given full legal protections, a fundraising street party attended by several prominent entertainers was held on 23 April 1989.

It was eventually decided to suspend the proposed building over the top of the theatre's remains, leaving them conserved beneath, resulting in what has been called "one of the weirdest sights in London". A blue plaque at 56 Park Street marks the spot.

The handling of the Rose Theatre by government, archaeologists and the developer provided impetus for the legitimisation of archaeology in the development process and led the Conservative government of Margaret Thatcher to introduce PPG 16 in an attempt to manage archaeology in the face of development threats.

When the Department of Greater London Archaeology (now MOLA) carried out the excavation work, the staff found many objects which are now stored in the museum itself. Portions of the theatre's foundations, under the ingressi (wooden stairs leading to the galleries), were littered with fruit seeds and hazelnut shells; it has been claimed that hazelnuts were the popcorn of English Renaissance drama. When combined with cinder and earth, they provided a tough floor surface "so tough, indeed, that 400 years later archaeologists had to take a pickaxe to it to penetrate it". Initially the floor of the yard (including the area beneath the raised wooden stage) had a screeded mortar surface but when the building was extended a compacted layer of silt, ash and clinker, mixed with hazelnut shells, was used. The nutshells were brought to the site from a nearby soap works, where the nuts were crushed for their oil, rather than evidence of litter left by the audience.

== Today ==
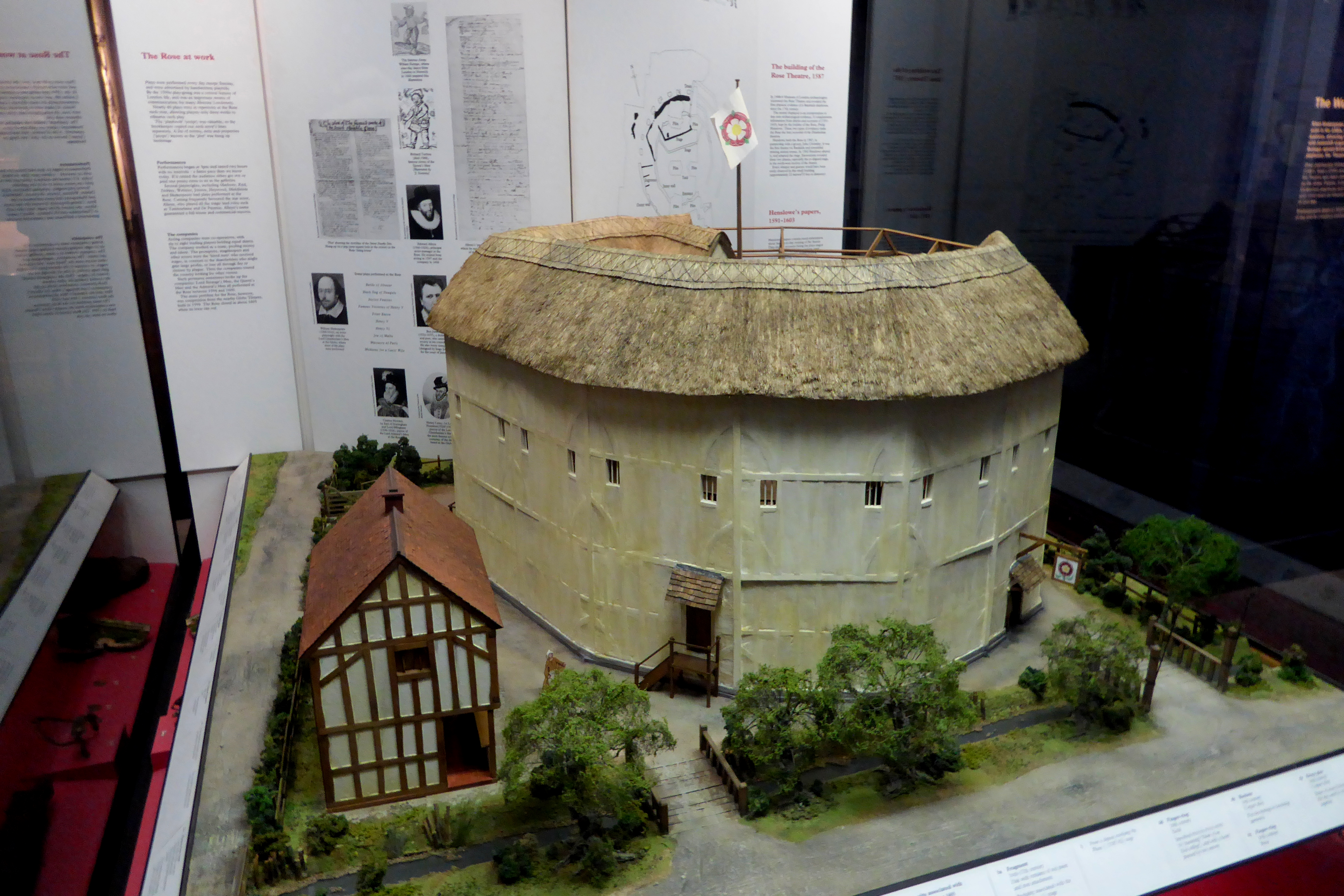
Model of The Rose in the Museum of London.

In 1999, the site was re-opened to the public, underneath the new development. Work continues to excavate this historic site further and to secure its future. The foundations of the Rose are covered in a few inches of water to keep the ground from developing major cracks. In 2003 the Rose was opened as a performance space with a production of Marlowe's Tamburlaine the Great.

== Modern replicas ==
A replica of The Rose Theatre was featured in the film Shakespeare in Love and after 10 years in storage was donated by Dame Judi Dench to the British Shakespeare Company, who were planning to rebuild it in the north of England, although the plans have not progressed any further since they were announced in 2009. In 2008 the Rose Theatre Kingston opened in Kingston upon Thames. It is a modern theatre, but based on the plan of the original Rose, revealed by archaeology in 1989.

== See also ==
- List of English Renaissance theatres
- Sam Wanamaker Playhouse
- Shakespeare's Globe
