= Philip Henslowe =

English theatrical entrepreneur & impresario (c.1550–1616)

Philip Henslowe (c. 1550 – 6 January 1616) was an Elizabethan theatrical entrepreneur and impresario. Henslowe's modern reputation rests on the survival of his diary, a primary source for information about the theatrical world of Renaissance London.

== Life ==
Henslowe was born in Lindfield, Sussex, into a family with roots in Devon. His father, Edmund Henslowe, was appointed Master of the Game for Ashdown Forest, Sussex, from 1539 until his death in 1562. Before Edmund Henslowe's death, his daughter Margaret had married Ralf Hogge, an ironmaster.

By the 1570s, Henslowe had moved to London, becoming a member of the Dyers' Company. Henslowe is recorded working as assistant to Henry Woodward, reputed to be the bailiff for Anthony Browne, 1st Viscount Montagu, owner of Cowdray House and Battle Abbey in Sussex. Henslowe married Woodward's widow, Agnes, and from 1577 lived in Southwark, opposite the Clink prison. His elder brother Edmund, a merchant, also owned property in Southwark. It was at one time assumed that his wife's inheritance gave Henslowe his start in business, but there is no evidence.

His success in business appears to have brought him some social prominence. By the early-17th century, he was a vestryman, churchwarden and overseer of the poor in St Saviour's ward in Southwark. During the reign of Elizabeth I, he was a Groom of the Chamber. Under James I, he served as a Gentleman Sewer of the Chamber. Henslowe also served as a collector of the Lay Subsidy.

Henslowe died in 1616 in London, still actively involved in the theatre.

== Business interests ==
Henslowe developed extensive business interests, including dyeing, starch-making, pawn-broking, money lending and trading in goat skins. He owned property in East Grinstead and Buxted, Sussex, where his brother-in-law, Ralf Hogge, lived. Between 1576 and 1586, Henslowe was involved in the trade in timber from Ashdown Forest. However, his main activity was as a landlord in Southwark. One of his authors, Henry Chettle, described him as being unscrupulously harsh with his poor tenants, even though Henslowe made many loans to Chettle and they seem to have been on friendly terms.

=== Theatrical interests ===
In 1584, Henslowe purchased a property known as The Little Rose, in Southwark, which contained rose gardens and, almost certainly, a brothel. In 1587, Henslowe and John Cholmley built The Rose, the third of the large, permanent playhouses in London, and the first in Bankside. From 1591, Henslowe partnered with the Admiral's Men after that company split with The Theatre's James Burbage over the division of receipts. Edward Alleyn, the Admiral's' lead actor, married Henslowe's stepdaughter Joan in 1592, and they worked in partnership.

In 1598 Burbage's company (by then, the Lord Chamberlain's Men) erected the new Globe Theatre in Bankside; Henslowe moved the Admiral's Men to the north-western corner of the city, into a venue he had financed, the Fortune Theatre. John Taylor, the "Water Poet", petitioned the King on behalf of the Watermen's Company, because of the expected loss of business transporting theatre patrons across the Thames.

He also had interests in the Newington Butts Theatre and The Swan Theatre in Southwark.

=== Animal shows ===
Henslowe and Alleyn also operated the Paris Garden, a venue for baitings; early in James's reign, they purchased the office of Keeper of the Royal Game, namely bulls, bears and mastiffs. In 1614, he and Jacob Meade built the Hope Theatre in Bankside; designed with a moveable stage for both plays and animal baiting, it was the last of the large open-roof theatres built before 1642. The animal shows ended up ascendant at this venue. The introduction to Ben Jonson's Bartholomew Fair, performed at the Hope in 1614, complains that the theatre is "as dirty as Smithfield, and as stinking every whit." The theatre did not have a regular theatrical tenant after 1617; Henslowe's share in it was willed to Alleyn.

== Henslowe's diary ==
Henslowe's "diary" is a valuable source of information on the theatrical history of the period. It is a collection of memoranda and notes that record payments to writers, box office takings, and lists of money lent. Also of interest are records of the purchase of expensive costumes and of stage properties, such as the dragon in Christopher Marlowe's Doctor Faustus, which provide insight into the staging of plays in Elizabethan theatre.

The diary is written on the reverse of pages of a book of accounts of his brother-in-law Ralf Hogge's ironworks, kept by his brother John Henslowe for the period 1576–1581. Hogge was the Queen's Gunstonemaker, and produced both iron cannon and shot for the Royal Armouries at the Tower of London. John Henslowe seems to have acted as his agent, and Philip prudently reused his old account book. These entries are a valuable source for the early iron-making industry.

The diary begins covering Henslowe's theatrical activities for 1592. Entries continue, with varying degrees of thoroughness (authors' names were not included before 1597), until 1609; in the years before his death, Henslowe appears to have run his theatrical interests from a greater distance. At some time after his death, his papers, including the diary, were transferred to the College of God’s Gift, Dulwich, which Alleyn had founded. They now reside at Dulwich College.

Henslowe recorded payments to twenty-seven Elizabethan playwrights. He variously commissioned, bought and produced plays by, or made loans to Ben Jonson, Thomas Middleton, Henry Chettle, George Chapman, Thomas Dekker, John Webster, Anthony Munday, Henry Porter, John Day, John Marston and Michael Drayton. The diary shows the varying partnerships between writers, in an age when many plays were collaborations. It also shows Henslowe to have been a careful man of business, obtaining security in the form of rights to his authors' works, and holding their manuscripts, while tying them to him with loans and advances. If a play was successful, Henslowe would commission a sequel.

Performances of works with titles similar to Shakespearean plays, such as a Hamlet, a Henry VI, Part 1, a Henry V, a Taming of the Shrew and a Titus Andronicus are mentioned in the diary with no author listed. Most of these plays were recorded when the Admiral's Men and the Lord Chamberlain's Men briefly joined forces when the playhouses were closed owing to the plague (June 1594).

In 1599, Henslowe paid Dekker and Henry Chettle for a play called Troilus and Cressida, which is probably the play currently known from British Library Add MS 10449 (the actors' names that appear in the plot connect it to the Admiral's Men and date it between March 1598 and July 1600). There is no mention of William Shakespeare (or Christopher Marlowe, Robert Greene, Thomas Kyd or any University Wits writer, or figures like Richard Burbage for that matter) in Henslowe's diary (which prompted the forgeries of John Payne Collier); their absence is due to the fact that Shakespeare and Burbage were only connected to Henslowe's companies in the early 1590s before Henslowe records any authors. Shakespeare's company, the Lord Chamberlain's Men, performed at The Theatre (starting in 1594) and later The Globe Theatre (starting in 1599).

=== Costumes and props ===
In 1598 Henslowe made an inventory of his company's stage props; 'along with numerous weapons and crowns, there was a boar's head, a wooden leg, a golden fleece and the cauldron in which Marlowe's Jew of Malta is boiled to death.'

== History ==
The papers first came to critical attention in 1780, when Edmond Malone requested them from the Dulwich College library; the papers had been misplaced and were not found until 1790. Malone made a transcript of the parts he viewed as relevant to his variorum edition of Shakespeare. The original was returned to Dulwich after Malone's death. (Malone's transcript was returned to the library around 1900.) The next scholar to examine the manuscripts was John Payne Collier.

== In popular culture ==
Henslowe was portrayed by actor Geoffrey Rush in the Academy Award-winning film Shakespeare in Love.
