= Inn-yard theatre =

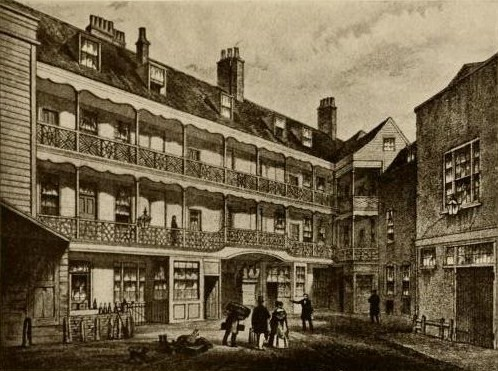
The Bell Savage Inn's inner courtyard, an inn dating back to 1420 but rebuilt in 1666. This picture shows its appearance in the 19th century, shortly before demolition.

In the historical era of English Renaissance drama, an Inn-yard theatre or Inn-theatre was a common inn with an inner courtyard with balconies that provided a venue for the presentation of stage plays.

== Beginnings ==
The Elizabethan era is appropriately famous for the construction of the earliest permanent professional playhouses in Britain, starting with James Burbage's The Theatre in 1576 and continuing through the Curtain (1577), the Rose, Swan, Globe and others —; a development that allowed the evolution of the drama of Christopher Marlowe, William Shakespeare, Ben Jonson and their contemporaries and successors. Prior to the building of The Theatre, plays were sometimes staged in public halls, the private houses of aristocrats, or royal palaces —; but most often, and most publicly, they were acted in the courtyards of inns. (It is an often-stated truism of the critical literature that the open-air public theatres or amphitheatres of Burbage and his successors were modeled on the inn yards, with their surrounding balconies, open space in the center, and stage to one side.) Though the surviving documentary record is frustratingly limited, "it seems certain that some of the inn-yards were converted into something like permanent theatres." These venues did not cease operation once the first purposely-built theatres appeared in 1576–77; to the contrary, they remained in use and constituted an important aspect of Elizabethan drama.

== Culmination ==
The available evidence indicates that six London inns were significant sites for drama during the second half of the sixteenth century. The following list gives their locations and dates of earliest evidence as inn-theatres.

- 1575 - the Bull Inn, Bishopsgate Street
- 1576 - the Bell Inn, Gracechurch Street
- 1557 - the Boar's Head Inn, Whitechapel, "without Aldgate"
- 1557 - the Saracen's Head Inn, Islington
- 1579 - the Bel Savage Inn, Ludgate Hill
- 1579 - the Cross Keys Inn, Gracechurch Street.

John Florio's English-Italian phrase book First Fruits (1578) refers to plays being staged at the Bull Inn. Richard Tarlton saw the famous performing horse "Marocco" at the Cross Keys Inn sometime before his death in 1588. In November 1589 the Lord Mayor of London ordered Lord Strange's Men not to perform in the city —; and they promptly showed their defiance by acting at the Cross Keys that afternoon. There were at least six inns and taverns in London in this era that employed the sign of the Boar's Head, which caused scholars significant confusion before the matter was clarified by C. J. Sisson. John Brayne, who was involved in both the Red Lion project and Burbage's Theatre in Shoreditch, attempted to convert the George Inn in Whitechapel into a theatre in 1580, but was unsuccessful.

Queen Elizabeth's Men were deliberately established as the premier playing company of their day in 1583; yet the royal charter that defined the troupe specified their venues for acting in London were two inn-yard theatres, the Bell Inn and the Bel Savage Inn.

The Lord Chamberlain's Men used the Cross Keys Inn as their winter quarters for a time.

In his famous anti-theatre diatribe Histriomastix (1632), Puritan polemicist William Prynne recounts one of the classic urban legends of his generation, which held that the Devil was conjured up onstage during a performance of Marlowe's Doctor Faustus, an event so horrifying that several members of the audience lost their sanity. This manifestation allegedly occurred during a performance of the play at the Bel Savage Inn.

== Crisis ==
The Lord Mayor and city authorities of London were consistently hostile to actors and theatrical performances, considering them a breeding ground for crime and civic disturbance; they made repeated attempts to suppress all theatrical activity within their jurisdiction. They were usually frustrated by the Lord Chamberlain, who was responsible for entertaining the Queen and Court and found the actors a valuable resource for that task. In the crucial period of the development of Elizabethan drama, two Lords Chamberlain in succession, Thomas Radclyffe, 3rd Earl of Sussex (Lord Chamberlain from 1572 to 1585) and Henry Carey, 1st Baron Hunsdon (from 1585 to 1596) were noblemen who maintained their own troupes of players (Sussex's Men and the Lord Chamberlain's Men respectively), and who countered the attempts of the London authorities to suppress the drama.

This situation reversed in 1596, with the death of Lord Hunsdon and the selection of William Brooke, 10th Baron Cobham as Lord Chamberlain. Cobham was sympathetic to the London authorities and hostile to the players; under his influence the Privy Council agreed to a prohibition of plays within the City of London. The London authorities proceeded to "pull down" and "put down" all the "Play-houses" within their municipality. (Theatre owners like James Burbage and Philip Henslowe wisely chose locations outside of city control.) A late report (from 1628) gives a somewhat defective and ambiguous list of the inn-theatres suppressed during 1596; but it seems clear that at least the Bull, the Bell, the Cross Keys, and the Bel Savage Inns were victimized.

== Reprieve ==
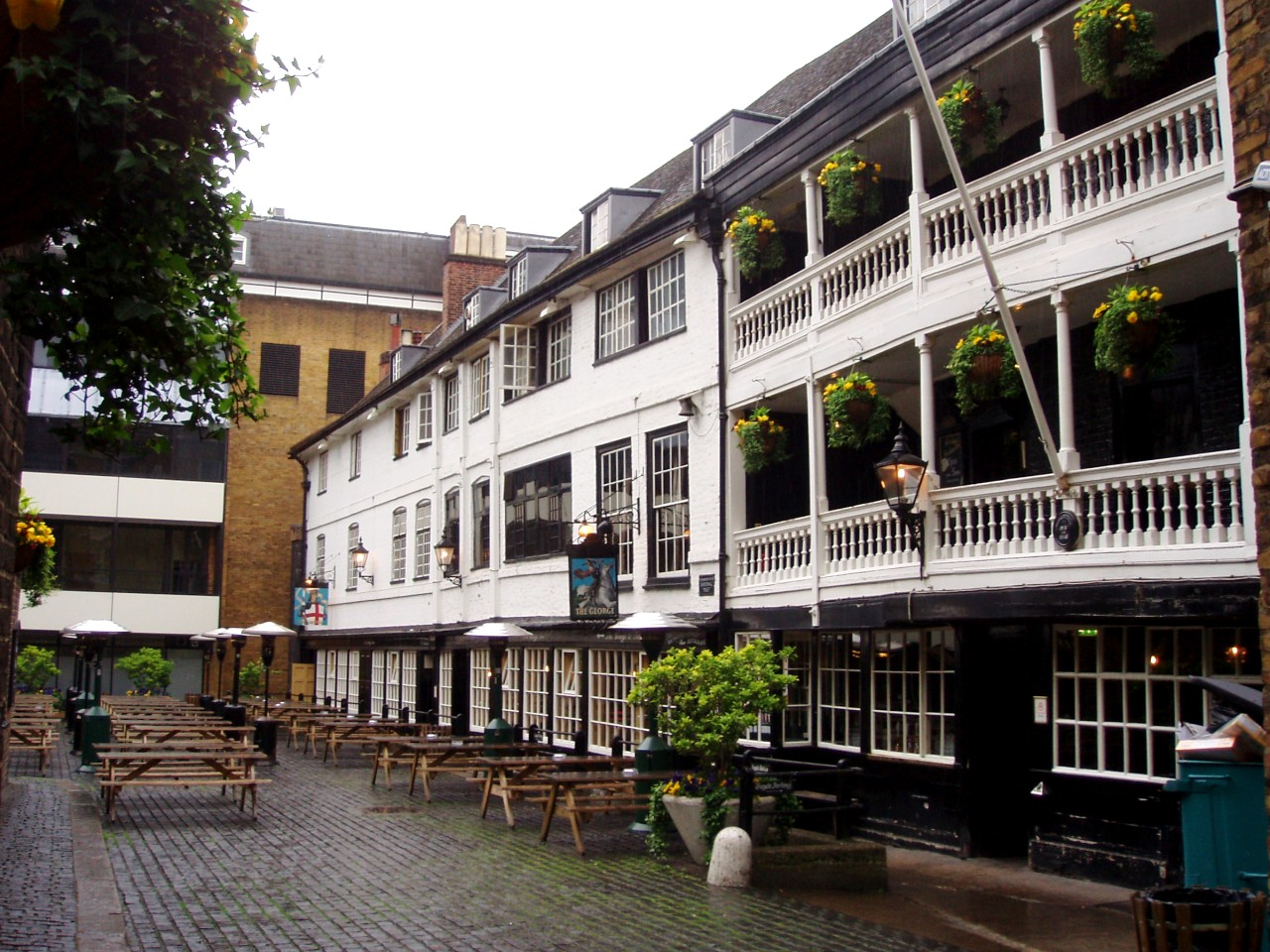
The George Inn, Southwark, a surviving galleried inn. Although the inn was established in the medieval period, the building was rebuilt after a fire in 1676.

Fortunately for Elizabethan drama and English literature, Lord Cobham died in March 1597; the office of Lord Chamberlain was then filled by George Carey, 2nd Baron Hunsdon, who returned to his father's policy of support and patronage for drama.

The remaining inn-yard theatres continued to function. The Boar's Head Inn was refurbished in 1598 and 1599, and the litigious theatre entrepreneur Francis Langley was involved there for a time. In 1602, Worcester's Men received official permission to become the third playing company permanently based in London; their first performing venue was the Boar's Head Inn. In 1604, an inn in Clerkenwell was converted into the Red Bull Theatre, which remained an important site for acting in the coming decades, and was finally abandoned only in 1660.
