= English Renaissance theatre =

Theatre of England between 1558 and 1642

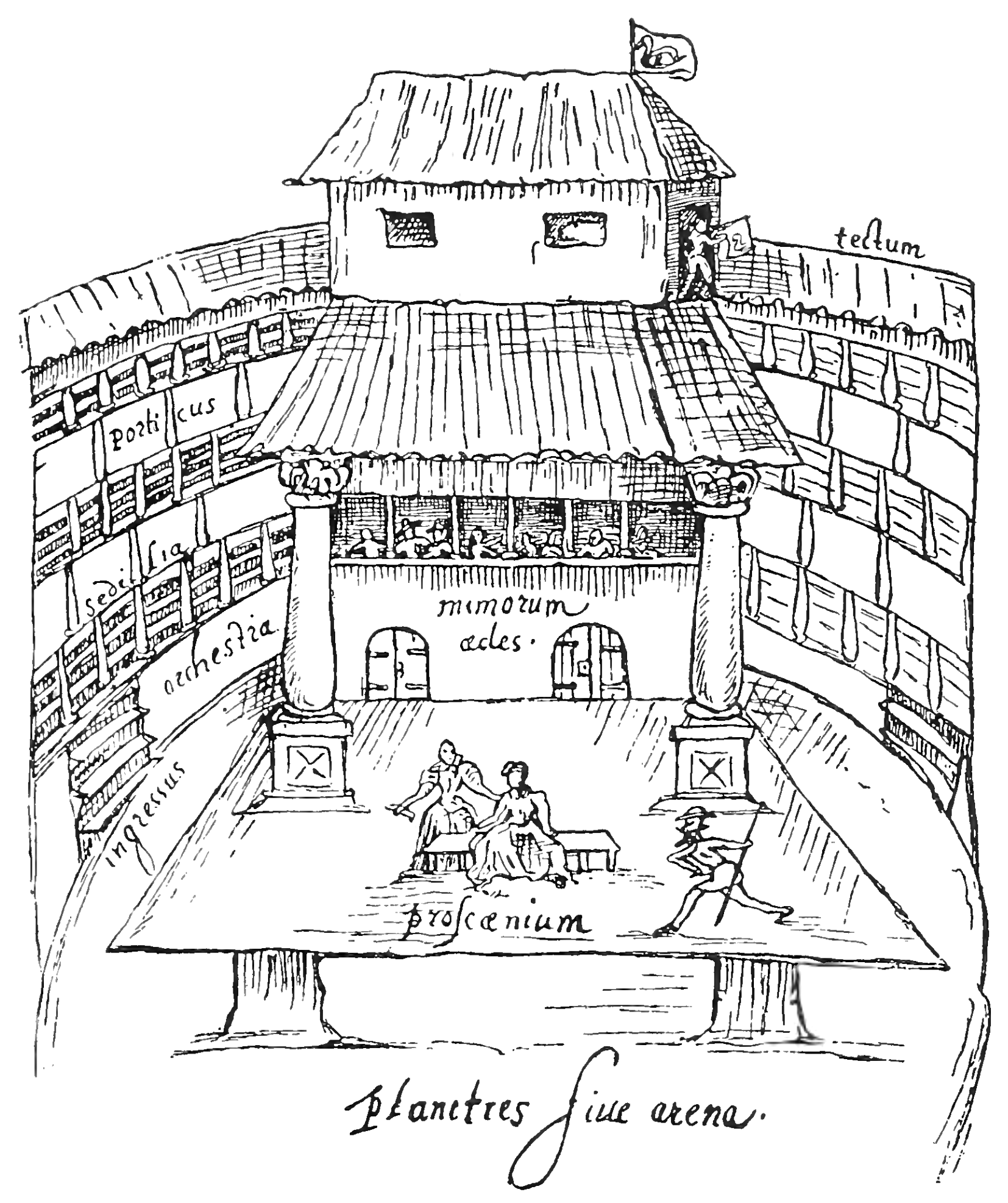
A 1596 sketch of a rehearsal in progress on the thrust stage of The Swan, a typical circular Elizabethan open-roof playhouse

The English Renaissance theatre or Elizabethan theatre was the theatre of England from 1558 to 1642. Its most prominent playwrights were William Shakespeare, Christopher Marlowe and Ben Jonson.

== Background ==
The term English Renaissance theatre encompasses the period between the mid-16th century to the ban on theatrical plays enacted by the English Parliament in 1642.

In a strict sense "Elizabethan" only refers to the period of Queen Elizabeth's reign (1558–1603). English Renaissance theatre may be said to encompass Elizabethan theatre from 1558 to 1603, Jacobean theatre from 1603 to 1625, and Caroline theatre from 1625 to 1642.

Along with the economics of the profession, the character of the drama changed towards the end of the period. Under Elizabeth, the drama was a unified expression as far as social class was concerned: the Court watched the same plays the commoners saw in the public playhouses. With the development of the private theatres, drama became more oriented towards the tastes and values of an upper-class audience. By the later part of the reign of Charles I, few new plays were being written for the public theatres, which sustained themselves on the accumulated works of the previous decades.

== Sites of dramatic performance ==
=== Grammar schools ===
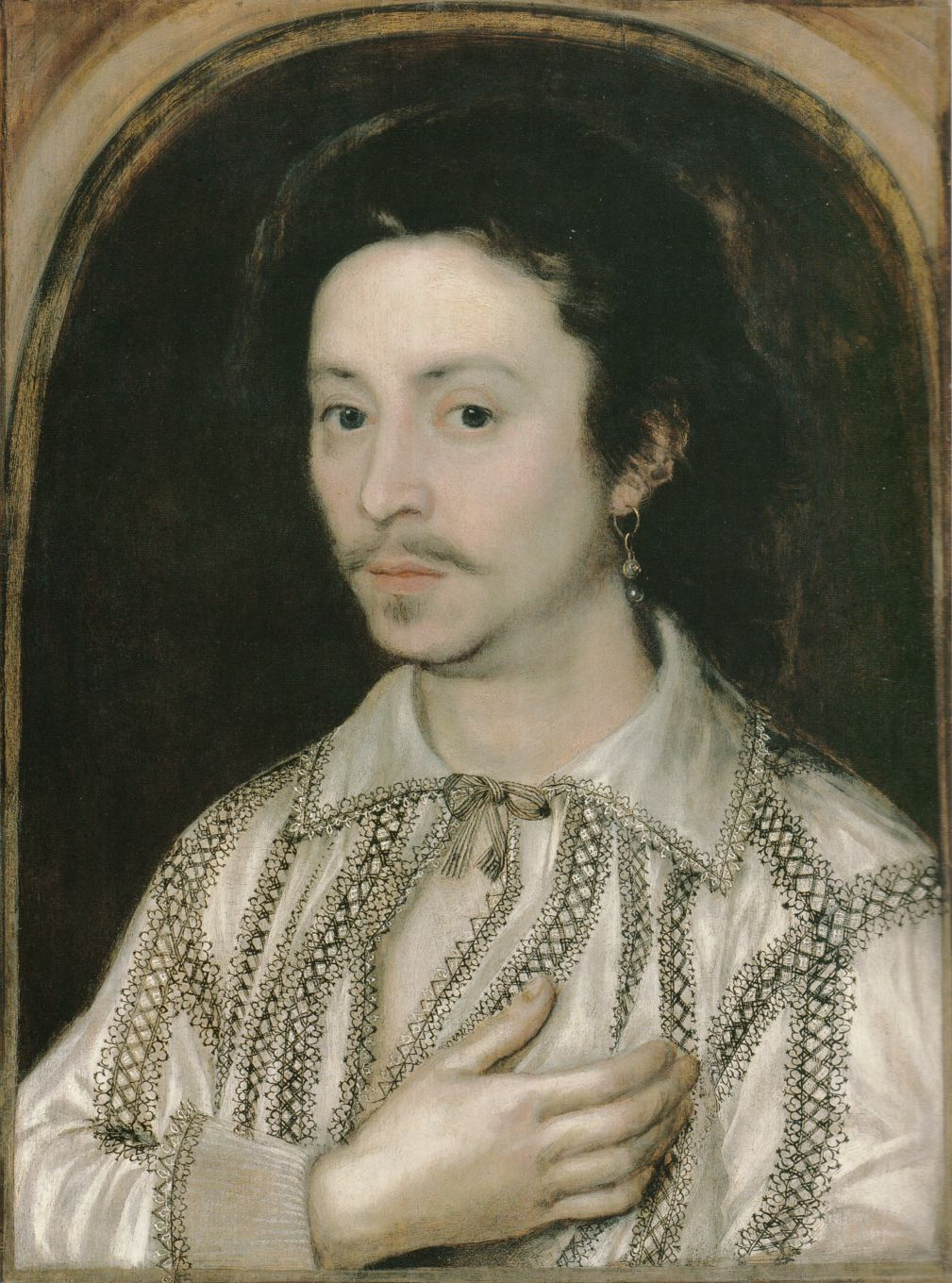
Nathan Field, who began his acting career as a boy player

The English grammar schools, like those on the continent, placed special emphasis on the trivium: grammar, logic, and rhetoric. Though rhetorical instruction was intended as preparation for careers in civil service such as law, the rhetorical canons of memory (memoria) and delivery (pronuntiatio), gesture and voice, as well as exercises from the progymnasmata, such as the prosopopoeia, taught theatrical skills. Students would typically analyse Latin and Greek texts, write their own compositions, memorise them, and then perform them in front of their instructor and their peers. Records show that in addition to this weekly performance, students would perform plays on holidays, and in both Latin and English.

=== Choir schools ===
Choir schools connected with the Elizabethan court included St. George’s Chapel, the Chapel Royal, and St. Paul’s. These schools performed plays and other court entertainments for the Queen. Between the 1560s and 1570s these schools had begun to perform for general audiences as well. Playing companies of boy actors were derived from choir schools. John Lyly is an earlier example of a playwright contracted to write for the children's companies; Lyly wrote Gallathea, Endymion, and Midas for Paul’s Boys. Another example is Ben Jonson, who wrote Cynthia’s Revels.

=== Universities ===
Academic drama stems from late medieval and early modern practices of miracles and morality plays as well as the Feast of Fools and the election of a Lord of Misrule. The Feast of Fools includes mummer plays. The universities, particularly Oxford and Cambridge, were attended by students studying for bachelor's degrees and master's degrees, followed by doctorates in Law, Medicine, and Theology. In the 1400s, dramas were often restricted to mummer plays with someone who read out all the parts in Latin. With the rediscovery and redistribution of classical materials during the English Renaissance, Latin and Greek plays began to be restaged. These plays were often accompanied by feasts. Queen Elizabeth I viewed dramas during her visits to Oxford and Cambridge. A well-known play cycle which was written and performed in the universities was the Parnassus Plays.

=== Inns of Court ===
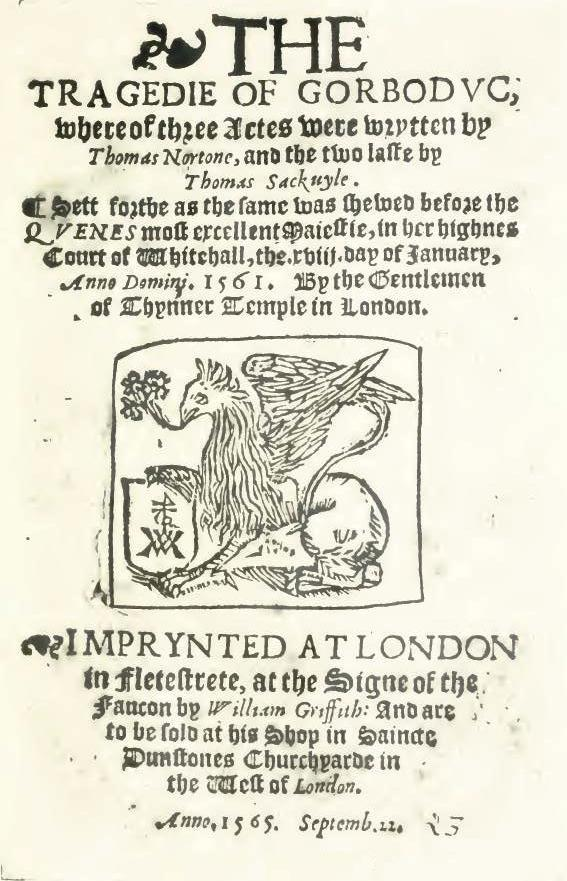
Gorboduc TP 1565

Upon graduation, many university students, especially those going into law, would reside and participate in the Inns of Court. The Inns of Court were communities of working lawyers and university alumni. Notable literary figures and playwrights who resided in the Inns of Court include John Donne, Francis Beaumont, John Marston, Thomas Lodge, Thomas Campion, Abraham Fraunce, Sir Philip Sidney, Sir Thomas More, Sir Francis Bacon, and George Gascoigne. Like the university, the Inns of Court elected their own Lord of Misrule. Other activities included participation in moot court, disputation, and masques. Plays written and performed in the Inns of Court include Gorboduc, Gismund of Salerne, and The Misfortunes of Arthur. An example of a famous masque put on by the Inns was James Shirley's The Triumph of Peace. Shakespeare's The Comedy of Errors and Twelfth Night were also performed here, although written for commercial theater.

== Establishment of playhouses ==
The first permanent English theatre, the Red Lion, opened in 1567 but it was a short-lived failure. The first successful theatres, such as The Theatre, opened in 1576.

The establishment of large and profitable public theatres was an essential enabling factor in the success of English Renaissance drama. Once they were in operation, drama could become a fixed and permanent, rather than transitory, phenomenon. Their construction was prompted when the Mayor and Corporation of London first banned plays in 1572 as a measure against the plague, and then formally expelled all players from the city in 1575. This prompted the construction of permanent playhouses outside the jurisdiction of London, in the liberties of Halliwell/Holywell in Shoreditch and later the Clink, and at Newington Butts near the established entertainment district of St. George's Fields in rural Surrey. The Theatre was constructed in Shoreditch in 1576 by James Burbage with his brother-in-law John Brayne (the owner of the unsuccessful Red Lion playhouse of 1567) and the Newington Butts playhouse was set up, probably by Jerome Savage, some time between 1575 and 1577. The Theatre was rapidly followed by the nearby Curtain Theatre (1577), the Rose (1587), the Swan (1595), the Globe (1599), the Fortune (1600), and the Red Bull (1604). (Note: A complete roster of what the Elizabethans called "public" theatres would include the Boar's Head Inn (1598), and the Hope Theatre (1613), neither of them major venues for drama in the era.)

Elsewhere, the Vagabonds Act 1572 left itinerant actors liable to prosecution as vagrants and caused them to seek wealthy sponsors who could provide a permanent play house for them. At the same time, members of the aristocracy found it useful to have a playing company available to entertain royal or noble guests and thus advance their social status.

== Playhouse architecture ==
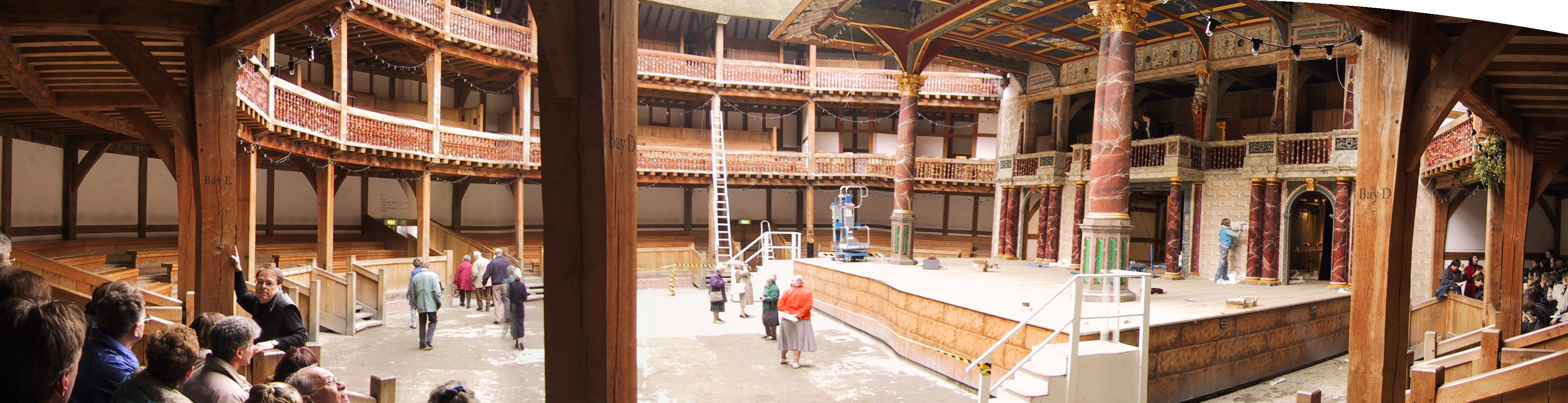
Panorama of the interior of the Globe Theatre, London

Archaeological excavations on the foundations of the Rose and the Globe in the late 20th century showed that all the London theatres had individual differences, but their common function necessitated a similar general plan. The public theatres were three stories high and built around an open space at the centre. Usually polygonal in plan to give an overall rounded effect, although the Red Bull and the first Fortune were square. The three levels of inward-facing galleries overlooked the open centre, into which jutted the stage: essentially a platform surrounded on three sides by the audience. The rear side was restricted for the entrances and exits of the actors and seating for the musicians. The upper level behind the stage could be used as a balcony, as in Romeo and Juliet and Antony and Cleopatra, or as a position from which an actor could harangue a crowd, as in Julius Caesar. The pit was the place where the poorest audience members could view the show. Around the 1600s a new area was introduced into the theaters, a 'gullet'. A gullet was an invisible corridor that the actors used to go to the wings of the stage where people usually changed clothes quickly.

The playhouses were generally built with timber and plaster. Individual theatre descriptions give additional information about their construction, such as flint stones being used to build the Swan. Theatres were also constructed to be able to hold a large number of people.

A different model was developed with the Blackfriars Theatre, which came into regular use on a long-term basis in 1599. (Note: The Blackfriars site was used as a theatre in the 1576-84 period; but it became a regular venue for drama only later.) The Blackfriars was small in comparison to the earlier theatres and roofed rather than open to the sky. It resembled a modern theatre in ways that its predecessors did not. Other small enclosed theatres followed, notably the Whitefriars (1608) and the Cockpit (1617). With the building of the Salisbury Court Theatre in 1629 near the site of the defunct Whitefriars, the London audience had six theatres to choose from: three surviving large open-air public theatres—the Globe, the Fortune, and the Red Bull—and three smaller enclosed private theatres: the Blackfriars, the Cockpit, and the Salisbury Court. (Note: Other "private" theaters of the era included the theatre near St Paul's Cathedral used by the Children of Paul's (1575) and the occasionally used Cockpit-in-Court (1629).) Audiences of the 1630s benefited from a half-century of vigorous dramaturgical development; the plays of Marlowe and Shakespeare and their contemporaries were still being performed on a regular basis, mostly at the public theatres, while the newest works of the newest playwrights were abundant as well, mainly at the private theatres.

== Audiences ==
Around 1580, when both the Theater and the Curtain were full on summer days, the total theater capacity of London was about 5000 spectators. With the building of new theater facilities and the formation of new companies, London's total theater capacity exceeded 10,000 after 1610.

Ticket prices in general varied during this time period. The cost of admission was based on where in the theatre a person wished to be situated, or based on what a person could afford. If people wanted a better view of the stage or to be more separate from the crowd, they would pay more for their entrance. Due to inflation that occurred during this time period, admission increased in some theaters from a penny to a sixpence or even higher.

Commercial theaters were largely located just outside the boundaries of the City of London, since City authorities tended to be wary of the adult playing companies, but plays were performed by touring companies all over England. English companies even toured and performed English plays abroad, especially in Germany and in Denmark. (Note: For example, Romeo and Juliet was performed in Nördlingen in 1605.)

Upper class spectators would pay for seats in the galleries, using cushions for comfort. In the Globe Theatre, nobles could sit directly by the side on the stage.

== Performances ==
The acting companies functioned on a repertory system: unlike modern productions that can run for months or years on end, the troupes of this era rarely acted the same play two days in a row. Thomas Middleton's A Game at Chess ran for nine straight performances in August 1624 before it was closed by the authorities; but this was due to the political content of the play and was a unique, unprecedented and unrepeatable phenomenon. The 1592 season of Lord Strange's Men at the Rose Theatre was far more representative: between 19 February and 23 June the company played six days a week, minus Good Friday and two other days. They performed 23 different plays, some only once, and their most popular play of the season, The First Part of Hieronimo, based on Kyd's The Spanish Tragedy, 15 times. They never played the same play two days in a row, and rarely the same play twice in a week. (Note: E. K. Chambers' The Elizabethan Stage (1923), reflects an earlier interpretation of the identity of the Hieronimo play.) The workload on the actors, especially the leading performers like Richard Burbage or Edward Alleyn, must have been tremendous.

One distinctive feature of the companies was that only men or boys performed. Female parts were played by adolescent boy players in women's costume. Some companies were composed entirely of boy players. (Note: For example the King's Revels Children, Children of Paul's, and the Children of the Chapel. Shakespeare even alludes to such companies, with a certain amount of scorn, in Hamlet act 2, scene 2.) Performances in the public theatres (like the Globe) took place in the afternoon with no artificial lighting, but when, in the course of a play, the light began to fade, candles were lit. In the enclosed private theatres (like the Blackfriars) artificial lighting was used throughout. Plays contained little to no scenery as the scenery was described by the actors or indicated by costume through the course of the play.

In the Elizabethan era, research has been conclusive about how many actors and troupes there were in the 16th century, but little research delves into the roles of the actors on the English renaissance stage. The first point is that during the Elizabethan era, women were not allowed to act on stage. The actors were all male; in fact, most were boys. For plays written that had male and female parts, the female parts were played by the youngest boy players. Stronger female roles in tragedies were acted by older boy players because they had more experience. As a boy player, many skills had to be implemented such as voice and athleticism (fencing was one).

In Elizabethan entertainment, troupes were created and they were considered the actor companies. They travelled around England as drama was the most entertaining art at the time.

Elizabethan actors never played the same show on successive days and added a new play to their repertoire every other week. These actors were getting paid within these troupes so for their job, they would constantly learn new plays as they toured different cities in England. In these plays, there were bookkeepers that acted as the narrators of these plays and they would introduce the actors and the different roles they played. At some points, the bookkeeper would not state the narrative of the scene, so the audience could find out for themselves. In Elizabethan and Jacobean plays, the plays often exceeded the number of characters/roles and did not have enough actors to fulfil them, thus the idea of doubling roles came to be. Doubling roles is used to reinforce a plays theme by having the actor act out the different roles simultaneously. The reason for this was for the acting companies to control salary costs, or to be able to perform under conditions where resources such as other actor companies lending actors were not present.

There were two acting styles implemented: formal and natural. Formal acting is objective and traditional, while natural acting attempts to create an illusion for the audience by remaining in character and imitating the fictional circumstances. The formal actor symbolises while the natural actor interprets. The natural actor impersonates while the formal actor represents the role. Natural and formal are opposites of each other, where natural acting is subjective. Overall, the use of these acting styles and the doubled roles dramatic device made Elizabethan plays very popular.

== Costumes ==
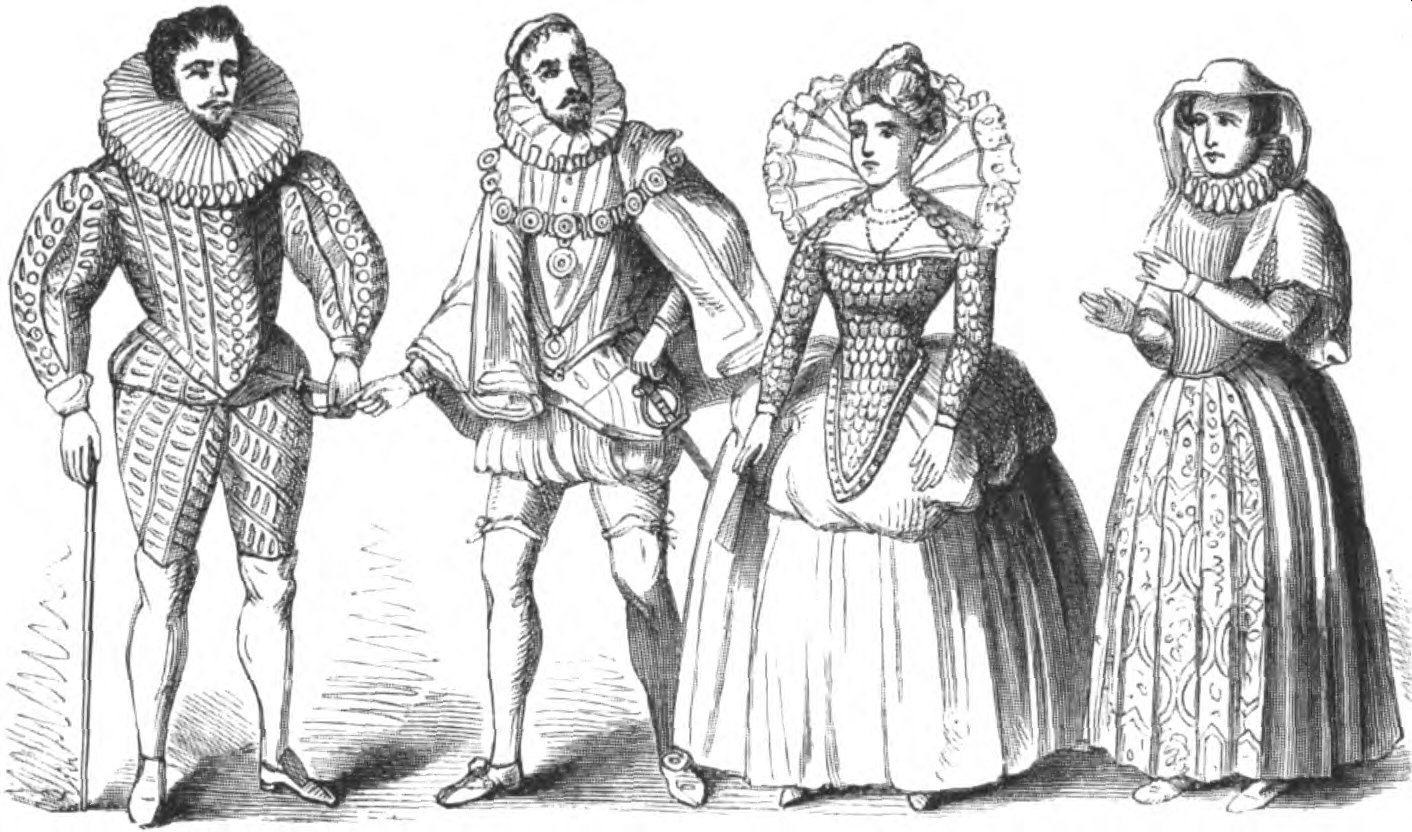
Costumes of the Elizabethan era; sketch by William Hickman Smith Aubrey, c. 1867

One of the main uses of costume during the Elizabethan era was to make up for the lack of scenery, set, and props on stage. It created a visual effect for the audience, and it was an integral part of the overall performance. Since the main visual appeal on stage were the costumes, they were often bright in colour and visually entrancing. Colours symbolized social hierarchy, and costumes were made to reflect that. For example, if a character was royalty, their costume would include purple. The colours, as well as the different fabrics of the costumes, allowed the audience to know the status of each character when they first appeared on stage.

Costumes were collected in inventory. More often than not, costumes wouldn't be made individually to fit the actor. Instead, they would be selected out of the stock that theatre companies would keep. A theatre company reused costumes when possible and would rarely get new costumes made. Costumes themselves were expensive, so usually players wore contemporary clothing regardless of the time period of the play. The most expensive pieces were given to higher class characters because costuming was used to identify social status on stage. The fabrics within a playhouse would indicate the wealth of the company itself. The fabrics used the most were: velvet, satin, silk, cloth-of-gold, lace and ermine. For less significant characters, actors would use their own clothes.

Actors also left clothes in their will for following actors to use. Masters would also leave clothes for servants in their will, but servants weren't allowed to wear fancy clothing, instead, they sold the clothes back to theatre companies. In the Tudor and Elizabethan eras, there were laws stating that certain classes could only wear clothing fitting of their status in society. There was a discrimination of status within the classes. Higher classes flaunted their wealth and power through the appearance of clothing, however, courtesans and actors were the only exceptions – as clothing represented their 'working capital', as it were, but they were only permitted to dress so while working. If actors belonged to a licensed acting company, they were allowed to dress above their standing in society for specific roles in a production.

== Playwrights ==
The growing population of London, the growing wealth of its people, and their fondness for spectacle produced a dramatic literature of remarkable variety, quality and extent. About 3,000 plays were written for the Elizabethan stage, and although most of them have been lost, at least 543 remain.

The people who wrote these plays were primarily self-made men from modest backgrounds. (Note: A few aristocratic women engaged in closet drama or dramatic translations. Chambers lists Elizabeth, Lady Cary; Mary Herbert, Countess of Pembroke; Jane, Lady Lumley; and Elizabeth Tudor.) Some of them were educated at either Oxford or Cambridge, but many were not. Although William Shakespeare and Ben Jonson were actors, the majority do not seem to have been performers, and no major author who came on to the scene after 1600 is known to have supplemented his income by acting. Their lives were subject to the same levels of danger and earlier mortality as all who lived during the early modern period: Christopher Marlowe was killed in an apparent tavern brawl, while Ben Jonson killed an actor in a duel. Several were probably soldiers.

Playwrights were normally paid in increments during the writing process, and if their play was accepted, they would also receive the proceeds from one day's performance. However, they had no ownership of the plays they wrote. Once a play was sold to a company, the company owned it, and the playwright had no control over casting, performance, revision or publication.

The profession of dramatist was challenging and far from lucrative. Entries in Philip Henslowe's Diary show that in the years around 1600 Henslowe paid as little as £6 or £7 per play. This was probably at the low end of the range, though even the best writers could not demand too much more. A playwright, working alone, could generally produce two plays a year at most. In the 1630s Richard Brome signed a contract with the Salisbury Court Theatre to supply three plays a year, but found himself unable to meet the workload. Shakespeare produced fewer than 40 solo plays in a career that spanned more than two decades: he was financially successful because he was an actor and, most importantly, a shareholder in the company for which he acted and in the theatres they used. Ben Jonson achieved success as a purveyor of Court masques, and was talented at playing the patronage game that was an important part of the social and economic life of the era. Those who were purely playwrights fared far less well: the biographies of early figures like George Peele and Robert Greene, and later ones like Brome and Philip Massinger, are marked by financial uncertainty, struggle and poverty.

Playwrights dealt with the natural limitation on their productivity by combining into teams of two, three, four, and even five to generate play texts. The majority of plays written in this era were collaborations, and the solo artists who generally eschewed collaborative efforts, like Jonson and Shakespeare, were the exceptions to the rule. Dividing the work, of course, meant dividing the income; but the arrangement seems to have functioned well enough to have made it worthwhile. Of the 70-plus known works in the canon of Thomas Dekker, roughly 50 are collaborations. In a single year (1598) Dekker worked on 16 collaborations for impresario Philip Henslowe, and earned £30, or a little under 12 shillings per week—roughly twice as much as the average artisan's income of 1s. per day. At the end of his career, Thomas Heywood would famously claim to have had "an entire hand, or at least a main finger" in the authorship of some 220 plays. A solo artist usually needed months to write a play (though Jonson is said to have done Volpone in five weeks); Henslowe's Diary indicates that a team of four or five writers could produce a play in as little as two weeks. Admittedly, though, the Diary also shows that teams of Henslowe's house dramatists—Anthony Munday, Robert Wilson, Richard Hathwaye, Henry Chettle, and the others, even including a young John Webster—could start a project, and accept advances on it, yet fail to produce anything stageworthy.

=== Timeline of English Renaissance playwrights ===
Short yellow lines indicate 27 years—the average age these authors began their playwriting careers

== Genres ==
Genres of the period included the history play, which depicted English or European history. Shakespeare's plays about the lives of kings, such as Richard III and Henry V, belong to this category, as do Christopher Marlowe's Edward II and George Peele's Famous Chronicle of King Edward the First. History plays also dealt with more recent events, like A Larum for London which dramatizes the sack of Antwerp in 1576. A better known play, Peele's The Battle of Alcazar (c. 1591), depicts the battle of Alcácer Quibir in 1578.

Tragedy was a very popular genre. Marlowe's tragedies were exceptionally successful, such as Dr. Faustus and The Jew of Malta. The audiences particularly liked revenge dramas, such as Thomas Kyd's The Spanish Tragedy. The four tragedies considered to be Shakespeare's greatest (Hamlet, Othello, King Lear and Macbeth) were composed during this period.

Comedies were common, too. A subgenre developed in this period was the city comedy, which deals satirically with life in London after the fashion of Roman New Comedy. Examples are Thomas Dekker's The Shoemaker's Holiday and Thomas Middleton's A Chaste Maid in Cheapside.

Though marginalised, the older genres like pastoral (The Faithful Shepherdess, 1608), and even the morality play (Four Plays in One, ca. 1608–13) could exert influences. After about 1610, the new hybrid subgenre of the tragicomedy enjoyed an efflorescence, as did the masque throughout the reigns of the first two Stuart kings, James I and Charles I.

Plays on biblical themes were common, Peele's David and Bethsabe being one of the few surviving examples.

== Printed texts ==
Only a minority of the plays of English Renaissance theatre were ever printed. Of Heywood's 220 plays, only about 20 were published in book form. A little over 600 plays were published in the period as a whole, most commonly in individual quarto editions. (Larger collected editions, like those of Shakespeare's, Ben Jonson's, and Beaumont and Fletcher's plays, were a late and limited development.) Through much of the modern era, it was thought that play texts were popular items among Renaissance readers that provided healthy profits for the stationers who printed and sold them. By the turn of the 21st century, the climate of scholarly opinion shifted somewhat on this belief: some contemporary researchers argue that publishing plays was a risky and marginal business—though this conclusion has been disputed by others. Some of the most successful publishers of the English Renaissance, like William Ponsonby or Edward Blount, rarely published plays.

A small number of plays from the era survived not in printed texts but in manuscript form. (Note: For example Sir Thomas More, John of Bordeaux, Believe as You List, and Sir John van Olden Barnavelt.)

== The end of English Renaissance theatre ==
The rising Puritan movement was hostile toward theatre, as they felt that "entertainment" was sinful. Politically, playwrights and actors were clients of the monarchy and aristocracy, and most supported the Royalist cause. The Puritan faction, long powerful in London, gained control of the city early in the First English Civil War, and on 2 September 1642, the Long Parliament, pushed by the Parliamentarian party, under Puritan influence, banned the staging of plays in the London theatres though it did not, contrary to what is commonly stated, order the closure, let alone the destruction, of the theatres themselves:

Whereas the distressed Estate of Ireland, steeped in her own Blood, and the distracted Estate of England, threatened with a Cloud of Blood by a Civil War, call for all possible Means to appease and avert the Wrath of God, appearing in these Judgements; among which, Fasting and Prayer, having been often tried to be very effectual, having been lately and are still enjoined; and whereas Public Sports do not well agree with Public Calamities, nor Public Stage-plays with the Seasons of Humiliation, this being an Exercise of sad and pious Solemnity, and the other being Spectacles of Pleasure, too commonly expressing lascivious Mirth and Levity: It is therefore thought fit, and Ordained, by the Lords and Commons in this Parliament assembled, That, while these sad causes and set Times of Humiliation do continue, Public Stage Plays shall cease, and be forborn, instead of which are recommended to the People of this Land the profitable and seasonable considerations of Repentance, Reconciliation, and Peace with God, which probably may produce outward Peace and Prosperity, and bring again Times of Joy and Gladness to these Nations.

— His Majesty's Stationery Office, Acts and Ordinances of the Interregnum, 1642–1660, "September 1642: Order for Stage-plays to cease"

The Act purports the ban to be temporary ("... while these sad causes and set Times of Humiliation do continue, Public Stage Plays shall cease and be forborn") but does not assign a time limit to it.

Even after 1642, during the English Civil War and the ensuing Interregnum (English Commonwealth), some English Renaissance theatre continued. For example, short comical plays called drolls were allowed by the authorities, while full-length plays were banned. The theatre buildings were not closed but rather were used for purposes other than staging plays. (Note: See for example the Red Bull Theatre and Robert Cox)

The performance of plays remained banned for most of the next eighteen years, becoming allowed again after the Restoration of the monarchy in 1660. The theatres began performing many of the plays of the previous era, though often in adapted forms. New genres of Restoration comedy and spectacle soon evolved, giving English theatre of the later seventeenth century its distinctive character.

== List of playwrights ==
- William Alabaster
- William Alexander, 1st Earl of Stirling
- Robert Armin
- Barnabe Barnes
- Lording Barry
- Francis Beaumont
- William Berkeley
- William Bird
- Samuel Brandon
- Antony Brewer
- Richard Brome
- Samuel Brooke
- William Browne (poet)
- Thomas Campion
- Lodowick Carlell
- William Cartwright
- Elizabeth Cary, Viscountess Falkland
- Robert Cecil, 1st Earl of Salisbury
- George Chapman
- Henry Cheke
- Henry Chettle
- John Clavell
- Anthony Chute
- Robert Daborne
- Samuel Daniel
- William Davenant
- Robert Davenport
- John Davidson
- John Day
- Thomas Dekker
- Michael Drayton
- Richard Edwardes
- George Ferebe
- Nathan Field
- John Fletcher
- Phineas Fletcher
- John Ford
- Abraham Fraunce
- Ulpian Fulwell
- William Gager
- George Gascoigne
- Henry Glapthorne
- Thomas Goffe
- Arthur Golding
- Robert Greene
- Fulke Greville
- Matthew Gwinne
- William Haughton
- Walter Hawkesworth
- Mary Herbert
- Thomas Heywood
- Thomas Hughes
- Thomas Ingelend
- John Jeffere
- Ben Jonson
- Henry Killigrew
- Thomas Killigrew
- Thomas Kyd
- Sir Henry Lee
- Thomas Legge
- Thomas Lodge
- Thomas Lupton
- John Lyly
- Lewis Machin
- Francis Marbury
- Gervase Markham
- Christopher Marlowe
- Shackerley Marmion
- John Marston
- John Mason
- Philip Massinger
- Thomas May
- Thomas Middleton
- Anthony Munday
- Thomas Nabbes
- Thomas Nashe
- Thomas Nelson
- Thomas Norton
- George Peele
- William Percy
- John Phillip
- John Pickering (dramatist)
- Henry Porter
- Thomas Preston
- Samuel Rowley
- William Rowley
- George Ruggle
- Joseph Rutter
- Thomas Sackville
- William Sampson
- William Shakespeare
- Edward Sharpham
- James Shirley
- Sir Philip Sidney
- Wentworth Smith
- John Stephens
- Sir John Suckling
- Robert Tailor
- Richard Tarlton
- Thomas Tomkis
- Cyril Tourneur
- Francis Verney
- William Wager
- George Wapull
- William Warner (poet)
- John Webster
- George Whetstone
- George Wilkins
- Robert Wilmot
- Arthur Wilson
- Robert Wilson
- Nathaniel Woodes
- Robert Yarington

== Actors ==
- William Alabaster
- Edward Alleyn
- Robert Armin
- William Barksted
- Richard Brome
- Richard Burbage
- William Cavendish
- Henry Condell
- Nathan Field
- Alexander Gough
- Thomas Greene
- Richard Gunnell
- Stephen Hammerton
- Charles Hart
- John Heminges
- Thomas Heywood
- John Honyman
- Ben Jonson
- Will Kempe
- John Lowin
- William Ostler
- Andrew Pennycuicke
- Augustine Phillips
- Thomas Pollard
- Thomas Pope
- Timothy Read
- Richard Robinson
- Samuel Rowley
- William Rowley
- William Shakespeare
- William Sly
- Robert Wilson

== Playhouses ==
- Blackfriars Theatre
- Cockpit Theatre
- Cockpit-in-Court
- Inn-yard theatres
- Newington Butts Theatre
- Red Bull Theatre
- Red Lion (theatre)
- Salisbury Court Theatre
- The Curtain
- The Fortune
- The Globe
- The Hope
- The Phoenix
- The Rose
- The Swan
- The Theatre
- Whitefriars Theatre

== Playing companies ==
- King's Revels Children
- King's Revels Men
- Lady Elizabeth's Men
- Leicester's Men
- Lord Strange's Men (later Derby's Men)
- Oxford's Boys
- Oxford's Men
- Pembroke's Men
- Prince Charles's Men
- Queen Anne's Men
- Queen Elizabeth's Men
- Queen Henrietta's Men
- The Admiral's Men
- The Children of Paul's
- The Children of the Chapel (Queen's Revels)
- The King's Men
- The Lord Chamberlain's Men
- Sussex's Men
- Warwick's Men
- Worcester's Men

== Timeline of English Renaissance playing companies ==
English Renaissance playing company timeline

This timeline charts the existence of major English playing companies from 1572 ("Acte for the punishment of Vacabondes", which legally restricted acting to players with a patron of sufficient degree) to 1642 (the closing of the theatres by Parliament). A variety of strolling players, and even early London-based troupes existed before 1572. The situations were often fluid, and much of this history is obscure; this timeline necessarily implies more precision than exists in some cases. The labels down the left indicate the most common names for the companies. The bar segments indicate the specific patron. In the case of children's companies (a distinct legal situation) some founders are noted.

== Other significant figures ==
- Susan Baskervile, investor and litigant
- William Beeston, manager
- George Buc, Master of the Revels 1609–1622
- Cuthbert Burbage, entrepreneur
- James Burbage, entrepreneur
- Ralph Crane, scribe
- Philip Henslowe, entrepreneur
- Henry Herbert, Master of the Revels 1623–1673
- Edward Knight, prompter
- Francis Langley, entrepreneur
- John Rhodes, manager
- Edmund Tilney, Master of the Revels 1579–1609

== See also ==
- Accession Day tilt
- History of theatre
- The Subject of Tragedy by Catherine Belsey

== Sources ==
- Astington, John H. (2010). Actors and Acting in Shakespeare's Time: The Art of Stage Playing. Cambridge: Cambridge University Press. doi:10.1017/CBO970511761379 (inactive 12 July 2025). ISBN 9780511761379 – via Cambridge Core.
- Bellinger, Martha Fletcher (1927). A Short History of the Drama. New York: Henry Holt and Company. hdl:2027/mdp.39015008227087. OL 17749089M.
- Blayney, Peter W. M. (1997). "The Publication of Playbooks". In Cox, John D.; Kastan, David Scott (eds.). A New History of Early English Drama. New York: Columbia University Press. pp. 383–422. ISBN 9780231102438.
- Boas, Frederick S. (1914). University Drama in the Tudor Age. Oxford: Clarendon Press. hdl:2027/mdp.39015030766243. OL 7149074M.
- Bowsher, Julian; Miller, Pat (2010). The Rose and the Globe: Playhouses of Shakespeare's Bankside, Southwark: Excavations 1988–91. Museum of London Archaeology. ISBN 978-1-901992-85-4.
- Bryson, Bill (2008). Shakespeare: The World as a Stage. HarperPerennial. p. 78. ISBN 978-0007197903.
- Calore, Michela (2003). "Elizabethan Plots: A Shared Code of Theatrical and Fictional Language". Theatre Survey. 44 (2). Cambridge University Press: 249–261. doi:10.1017/S0040557403000127. eISSN 1475-4533. ISSN 0040-5574. S2CID 162509372 – via Cambridge Core.
- Chambers, E.K. (2009) [first published 1923]. The Elizabethan Stage. Vol. 3. New York: Oxford University Press. ISBN 9780199567508.
- Christiansen, Nancy L. (1997). "Rhetoric as Character-Fashioning: The Implications of Delivery's 'Places' in the British Renaissance Paideia". Rhetorica: A Journal of the History of Rhetoric. 15 (3). International Society for the History of Rhetoric: 297–334. doi:10.1525/rh.1997.15.3.297. eISSN 1533-8541. ISSN 0734-8584. JSTOR 10.1525/rh.1997.15.3.297. S2CID 170122602.
- Cook, Ann Jennalie (2014). The Privileged Playgoers of Shakespeare's London, 1576-1642. Princeton: Princeton University Press. ISBN 9780691614953.
- Cunningham, Karen J. (2007). "'So Many Books, So Many Rolls of Ancient Time': The Inns of Court and Gorboduc". In Kezar, Dennis (ed.). Solon and Thespis: Law and Theater in the English Renaissance. Notre Dame, Indiana: University of Notre Dame Press. pp. 197–217. ISBN 978-0-268-03313-2.
- Dawson, Anthony B. (2002). "International Shakespeare". In Wells, Stanley; Stanton, Sarah (eds.). The Cambridge Companion to Shakespeare on Stage. Cambridge Companions to Shakespeare. Cambridge: Cambridge University Press. pp. 174–193. doi:10.1017/CCOL0521792959.010. ISBN 9780511999574 – via Cambridge Core.
- Farmer, Alan B.; Lesser, Zachary (2005). "The Popularity of Playbooks Revisited". Shakespeare Quarterly. 56 (1). Folger Shakespeare Library: 1–32. doi:10.1353/shq.2005.0043. eISSN 1538-3555. ISSN 0037-3222. JSTOR 3844024. S2CID 59134858.
- Firth, C.H.; Rait, R.S., eds. (1911). "September 1642: Order for Stage-plays to cease". Acts and Ordinances of the Interregnum, 1642-1660. Laws, etc. London: His Majesty's Stationery Office. hdl:2027/inu.30000046036137. OL 6559925M.
- Gurr, Andrew (2009). The Shakespearean Stage 1574–1642 (4th ed.). Cambridge: Cambridge University Press. doi:10.1017/CBO9780511819520. ISBN 9780511819520 – via Cambridge Core.
- Halliday, F.E. (1964). A Shakespeare Companion 1564–1964. Baltimore: Penguin. OCLC 683393. OL 5906173M.
- Hattaway, Michael (2008). Elizabethan Popular Theatre: Plays in Performance. London: Routledge. ISBN 9780415489010.
- Ingram, William (1992). The Business of Playing: The Beginnings of The Adult Professional Theater in Elizabethan London. Cornell University Press. ISBN 978-0-8014-2671-1.
- Ichikawa, Mariko (2012). The Shakespearean Stage Space. Cambridge: Cambridge University Press. doi:10.1017/CBO9781139097192. ISBN 9781139097192 – via Cambridge Core.
- Keenan, Siobhan (2002). Travelling Players in Shakespeare's England. Basingstoke: Palgrave Macmillan. doi:10.1057/9780230597549. ISBN 978-0-333-96820-8.
- Keenan, Siobhan (2014). Acting Companies and their Plays in Shakespeare's London. London: Bloomsbury Publishing. doi:10.5040/9781472575692. ISBN 9781408146637.
- Kregor, Karl H. (1993). "Doubled Roles in English Renaissance Drama: Problems, Possibilities and Marlowe's Edward II". Theatre History Studies. 13. University of Alabama Press. ISSN 0733-2033.
- MacIntyre, Jean (1992). Costumes and Scripts in the Elizabethan Theatres. Edmonton: University of Alberta Press. ISBN 978-0-88864-226-4.
- Maclennan, Ian Burns (1994). "If I were a woman": A study of the boy player in the Elizabethan public theatre (PhD thesis).
- Mann, David Albert (1991). The Elizabethan Player: Contemporary Stage Representation. Routledge Library Editions. Routledge. ISBN 9781138235656.
- Montrose, Louis (1996). The Purpose of Playing: Shakespeare and the Cultural Politics of the Elizabethan Theatre. University of Chicago Press. ISBN 9780226534831.
- Ordish, T. Fairman (1899). Early London Theatres: In the Fields. Antiquary's library. London: Elliot Stock. hdl:2027/hvd.hnnr4j. OL 16796098M.
- Triesault, Jon Lloyd (1970). Elizabethan public playhouse acting: Its development and complex style (MA thesis). University of Southern California. Archived from the original on 28 February 2018.
- Wickham, Glynne; Berry, Herbert; Ingram, William (2000). English professional theatre, 1530-1660. Cambridge: Cambridge University Press. ISBN 978-0-521-23012-4.
