= Margaret Brayne =

16th-century London theatre owner

Margaret Brayne (née Stowers; d. 1593) was an important figure in the early modern theatre industry – particularly about the construction and running of The Theatre in Shoreditch (the playhouse in which William Shakespeare began his career as actor and playwright). Margaret is best known for the lengthy legal battle she fought to regain co-ownership of The Theatre following her husband's death. The documents produced during this dispute provide a large quantity of information about the appearance and management of early modern playhouses as well as the area and contemporary inhabitants of Shoreditch.

== Marriage and family ==
Little is known about Stower's life before her marriage to grocer John Brayne on 14 January 1565, other than that her maiden name was Margaret Stowers and that she belonged to the parish of St Dionis Backchurch. Margaret and John had had four children by 1573: Robert (b. 1565), Roger (b. 1566), Rebecca (b. 1568), and John (b. 1573). All four children were baptised at St Stephen Walbrook (Bucklersbury) but soon died – at least three of them in infancy. Margaret had a fifth child (Katherine, d. 1593) after her husband died in 1586. She insisted that the child's father was John Brayne, but was accused of adultery by her enemies.

== The Theatre ==
In 1576, John Brayne partnered with James Burbage to build a public playhouse on the site of the dissolved priory of Holywell in Shoreditch. With no written agreement, Brayne agreed to supply most of the funds needed to erect the building on the understanding that Burbage was to have the lease put into both their names. The cost of the building project quickly escalated: Brayne and Burbage originally planned to spend around £200, but spent about £700. Margaret and John took the place of two manual labourers to reduce the cost of construction.

In 1586, around a decade after The Theatre opened for business, Margaret is recorded as being a ‘gatherer’ – a person who stood at one of the playhouse's entry points and collected money from entering playgoers.

== Legal disputes ==
John and Margaret Brayne were bankrupted as a result of the financial difficulties caused by the Theatre construction project and a later unfortunate investment (The George Inn in Whitechapel). Burbage never added John Brayne's name to the playhouse lease, and the partners quarrelled. John Brayne died in 1586 while the dispute was unresolved. The Burbages continued to share the playhouse profits with Margaret Brayne for a time but stopped in 1589.

Margaret believed that Robert Miles – a friend and business partner of John Brayne – was responsible for her husband's death. Margaret pursued Miles at court for murder and sued him for a share in The George (the establishment in which John Brayne and Miles had invested together). Margaret then gave birth to Katherine and became close friends with Miles. The Burbages believed that Miles was Katherine Brayne's father and that he and Margaret had conspired to kill John Brayne.

In 1588, supported financially by Miles, Margaret Brayne tried to reclaim the money that she and John Brayne had lost to the playhouse scheme. Margaret and Miles began trying in a court of common law to collect the value of two bonds that Burbage had given Brayne or to gain ownership of half of The Theatre and so collect half of its profits. In 1588, Burbage sued Margaret and the creditors to get the bonds cancelled and to prevent any claims on The Theatre. Margaret soon counter-sued. These two lawsuits continued unresolved for seven years, by which time Margaret had died and Miles was continuing with the case alone. The dispute was never resolved: Miles did not collect the value of the bonds, and James Burbage died in 1597.

== Death and legacy ==
Margaret died of the plague in 1593 and was buried in the churchyard of St Mary Matfelon on 13 April 1593. Margaret's will names Miles as her heir; she left Miles her goods, and her lawsuits, and also entrusted her daughter to his care (Katherine Brayne). Katherine also died of the plague three months after Margaret, and was buried in the same churchyard on 23 July.

The numerous documents produced during the lengthy legal battle fought by Margaret Brayne and Robert Miles have been closely studied by scholars for more than 160 years. Now held at The National Archives in London, these documents feature a huge quantity of information about the early modern playing industry and the wider culture of the period.
