= Cuthbert Burbage =

16th/17th-century English theatrical impresario

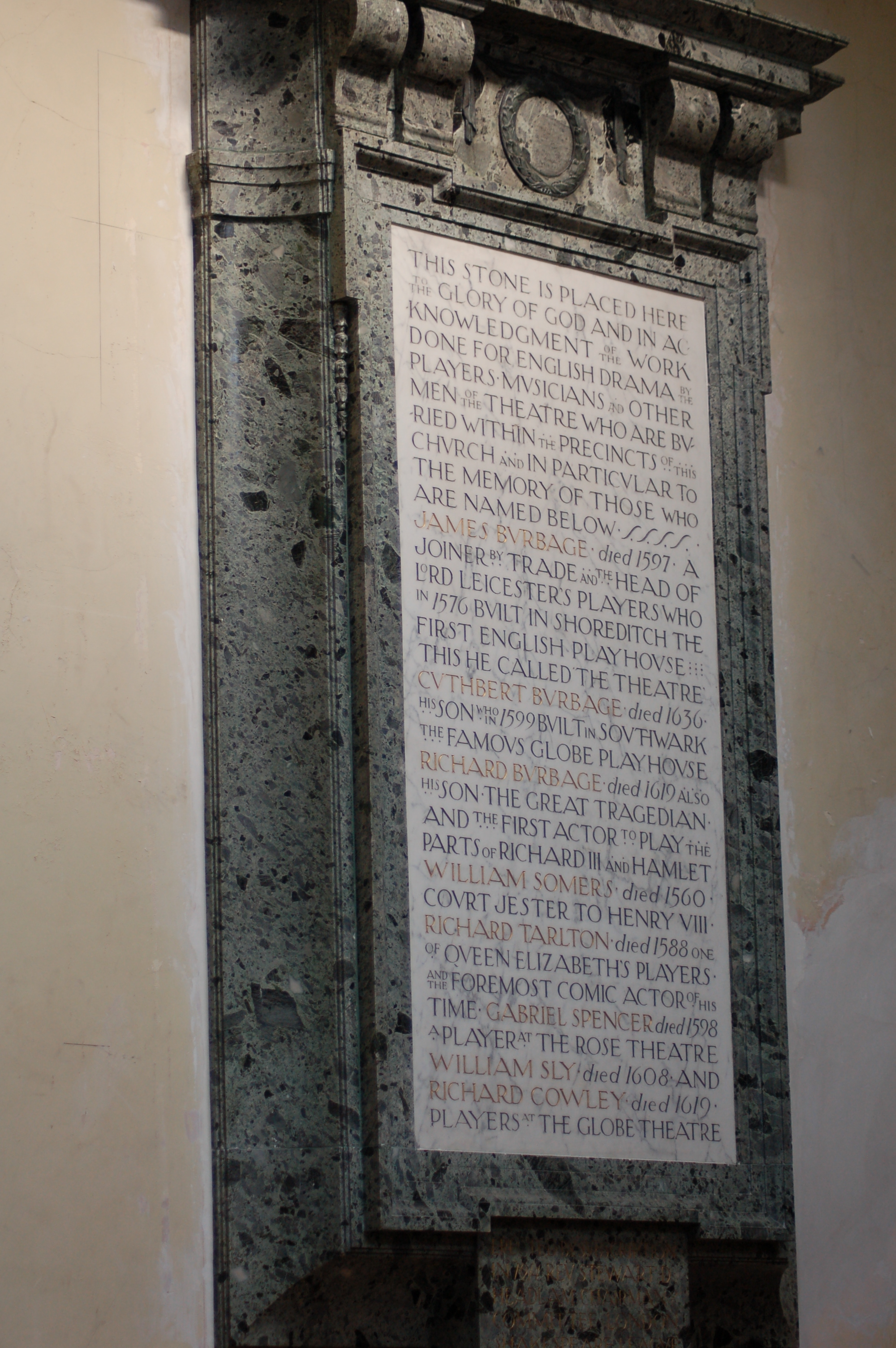
- Memorial plaque commemorating Cuthbert Burbage and others buried at St. Leonard's, Shoreditch
- Born: 1565; London, England, Kingdom of England
- Died: 15 September 1636 (aged 70–71); London, England, Kingdom of England
- Burial place: London, England, United Kingdom
- Spouse: Elizabeth Cox
- Parent(s): James Burbage; Ellen Brayne

Cuthbert Burbage (1565 – 15 September 1636) was an English theatrical figure, son of James Burbage, builder of the Theatre in Shoreditch and elder brother of the actor Richard Burbage. From 1589 he was the owner of the ground lease of the Theatre. Best known for his central role in the construction of the Globe Theatre, he was for four decades a significant agent in the success and endurance of Shakespeare's company, the King's Men.

== Family ==
The Burbage family is now thought to have come to London from Bromley in Kent. Cuthbert Burbage, baptized 15 June 1565 at St. Stephen Coleman Street near the London Guildhall, was the elder of the two surviving sons of James Burbage and Ellen Brayne (c.1542–1613), the daughter of Thomas Brayne (d.1562), a London tailor, and his wife, Alice Barlow (d.1566). His younger brother was the renowned actor, Richard Burbage. He had two sisters, Ellen (baptized 13 June 1574, buried 13 December 1596) and Alice (baptized 11 March 1576).

== The Theatre in Shoreditch ==
Burbage's father found employment for him with Sir Walter Cope, a second cousin of Lady Burghley, and gentleman usher to William Cecil, 1st Baron Burghley. According to Wallace, Cuthbert Burbage's position as a 'servant' to Cope was likely as a clerk in the Treasury.

In June 1586 he reached the age of majority, and joined his father in an ongoing legal dispute over the Theatre in Shoreditch. In August of that year the London grocer John Brayne, his father's brother-in-law, died, allegedly as a result of blows at the hands of his partner in the building of the George Inn in Whitechapel, the London goldsmith, Robert Miles, who was 'tried for murder' at a coroner's inquest.

James Burbage and Brayne had originally financed the building of the Theatre in Shoreditch together; it was later claimed that Brayne had bankrupted himself in so doing. However they had no written agreement governing the terms of their partnership, and had earlier fallen out. Brayne, who was childless, had failed to revise his will to leave his interest in the Theatre to James Burbage's children, as he had promised to do, and Burbage had failed to grant Brayne a half interest in the 21-year ground lease which he had signed with Giles Allen on 13 April 1576, and had kept it solely in his name. On 9 August 1577 an assignment of lease had been drawn up, and on 22 May 1578 Burbage signed a bond in the amount of £400 requiring him to assign a half interest in the ground lease to Brayne, but this was never done. Brayne accused Burbage of double-dealing, and in the following month the partners submitted their dispute to arbitration by two friends, in the course of which Burbage struck Brayne and they fell to fisticuffs. On 12 July 1578, the arbitrators submitted the articles containing their decision, and both Burbage and Brayne signed bonds in the amount of £200 as a guarantee of performance.

To further complicate matters, in order to evade his creditors, not only with respect to the Theatre but also in connection with the building of the George Inn with Robert Miles, Brayne signed various deeds of gift of his property, and on 26 September 1579 Burbage borrowed £125 8s 11d from the London grocer John Hyde, in return for which he mortgaged the ground lease of the Theatre for a one-year term. Hyde was not repaid, and the ground lease was forfeited to Hyde on 27 September 1580. Hyde allowed Burbage to continue operating the Theatre and extended the lease, but it was again forfeited to Hyde for non-payment. Hyde had Burbage arrested for debt in June 1582, and tried to put Brayne out as part owner of the Theatre.

In the same year, 1582, Edmund Peckham sued Giles Allen over ownership of the ground on which the Theatre stood, and their dispute escalated to the point that, as Cuthbert Burbage later deposed in 1600, his father was forced to hire men to guard the Theatre both day and night. Performances were stopped, and Leicester's Men, who had been playing there, disbanded as a company. James Burbage then became Lord Hunsdon's man, and from 1583 on Hunsdon's Men, known as the Lord Chamberlain's Men from 1585, performed at the Theatre.

Thus, at the time of Brayne's death in August 1586, the only legal documents which established that Brayne had had any financial interest in the Theatre were the two bonds which he had managed to get Burbage to sign. James Burbage allowed Brayne's widow, Margaret (née Stowers), a share of the profits for a short time, but then cut her off. At about the same time Hyde, as legal owner of the forfeited ground lease, falsely represented that he had sold his interest to his father-in-law, George Clough, and tried to remove James Burbage from the Theatre and replace him with Clough.

In early 1587 Margaret Brayne, with financial backing from Robert Miles, sued James Burbage at common law in an attempt to either recover on the bonds or obtain a half interest in the ground lease and the profits of the Theatre. In the same year the executors of Robert Gardner, to whom Brayne had made one of his deeds of gift, also sued Burbage. In the autumn of 1588 Burbage brought an action of his own against Margaret Brayne in Chancery, and Margaret Brayne then counter-sued in Chancery. The legal battles between Burbage and the widow Brayne continued for a decade, with Burbage always emerging as the victor.

While these lawsuits were ongoing, both James Burbage and Margaret Brayne sought to obtain an assignment of the ground lease from Hyde. In June 1589 both James and Cuthbert Burbage sought help from Cuthbert's employer, Walter Cope, who accordingly wrote to Hyde suggesting that he, Cope, might be of service to Hyde with the Lord Treasurer, Lord Burghley, on some future occasion if Hyde would assign the ground lease of the Theatre to Cuthbert Burbage. With some reluctance Hyde complied, and on 7 June 1589 assigned his interest in the ground lease of the Theatre to Cuthbert Burbage. According to Wallace, James Burbage continued to manage the Theatre, and business went on much as before, 'but the Theatre itself was Cuthbert's'. Hyde said later that he would not have made the assignment had it not been for Cope's letter. Cuthbert Burbage was equally dissatisfied with the arrangement. He later deposed that he agreed only to save his father from debt, and was of the view that he could have used his influence with Cope to better personal advantage. He was forced to borrow money to pay Hyde, and although the amount is not known with certainty, a statement by Hyde himself indicates that it was almost the entire original debt of £125 8s 11d plus interest.

Through his ownership of the ground lease, Cuthbert Burbage was drawn further into the ongoing battles between his father and the widow Brayne. On 4 November 1590 she obtained a court order sequestering the Theatre property until the hearing of the case; however on 13 November Cuthbert succeeded in having that order stayed, and obtained an order for performance of the 1578 arbitration. On 16 November Margaret Brayne, Robert Miles and his son Ralph, and a friend, Nicholas Bishop, took a copy of the order to the Theatre to enforce its terms by taking half the profits from the gallery that day. They arrived just as playgoers were flocking in for a performance. James Burbage, after an initial argument through a window of the Theatre, came down into the yard and called Robert Miles a knave and a rascal, and the widow Brayne a 'murdering whore'. James Burbage's wife and her son Richard Burbage, then only about nineteen, came into the yard and beat Robert Miles with a broomstaff. Richard Burbage, after 'scornfully and disdainfully playing with Nicholas Bishop's nose', threatened to beat him also. At that point Cuthbert Burbage arrived, and threatened the intruders with 'great and horrible oaths'. They were then violently thrust out of the yard. Some of the actors were attracted by the tumult, among them John Alleyn, brother of Edward Alleyn, who also put in a word for the widow Brayne, to no avail. The Admiral's Men, of which the Alleyn brothers were members, subsequently withdrew from the Theatre and went across the river to play at Henslowe's theatre. On 28 November Margaret Brayne had James Burbage arrested for being in contempt of the court order, and for the next two or three years there was a lengthy investigation into the contempt issue which was still ongoing when Margaret Brayne died in late April 1593. In her will dated 8 April she made Robert Miles her sole executor and left him all her property, including her half interest in the Theatre, and he thereby inherited the litigation in which he had already been active as her financial backer. Miles filed a bill of reviver near the end of the year and continued the suit in Chancery until 28 May 1595, when the court finally adjudged that he should attempt to collect on the bonds in the common law courts, which he appears not to have attempted.

James Burbage died in February 1597, and two months later the ground lease on the Theatre expired, Giles Allen having refused to renew it. At this point Miles brought an action against Cuthbert Burbage in the Court of Requests, the outcome of which is not known as the relevant documents are no longer extant.

== The Globe in Southwark ==
Cuthbert Burbage was left to execute the matter of finding the Lord Chamberlain's Men a new home after the lease of the Theatre expired. James Burbage's attempt to bring his company to the Blackfriars Theatre had been stymied by opposition from Blackfriars' wealthy residents; Burbage and company were faced with an imminent crisis.

After a last futile attempt to renew the lease, Burbage took action. He leased the Blackfriars to impresario Henry Evans, whose intended use of it for performances by children did not attract opposition. The situation regarding the Theatre was more problematic. The lease, however, gave him the right to use the framing timber of the building, if he did so before the expiration of the lease. When he did not do so, Alleyn announced his intention to use the timber for his own purposes. Looking for a place for his new theatre, Burbage made a verbal agreement with Nicholas Brend for a lease on a stretch of land on Maid Lane in Bankside, near Philip Henslowe's Rose Theatre. Burbage hired Peter Streete to take down the old Theatre and to build the new one from as much of the salvaged material as possible. On the night of 28 December 1598, Cuthbert, Richard, a certain William Smith "of Waltham Cross, in the County of Hertford, gentleman", Streete, and twelve others took down the Theatre, carried all the wood and timber across the River Thames and built it again there. This new theatre was renamed the Globe. It opened by September 1599. (The Chamberlain's Men, in the interim, appear to have performed at the Curtain Theatre in Shoreditch).

The Globe provided a stable home for the Chamberlain's Men and their successors, the King's Men, for the next four decades. Cuthbert and his brother had financed the new venue by making five actors (William Shakespeare, John Heminges, Augustine Phillips, Thomas Pope, and William Kempe) as a group, half-sharers in the profits of the house: this arrangement seems to have solidified the structure of the group, helping cement the position of the Chamberlain's Men as the preeminent troupe in London.

Together with Richard Robinson and Winifred (d.1642), his wife, William Heminges, Joseph Taylor and John Lowin, Burbage filed a Bill of Complaint on 28 January 1632 in the Court of Requests against the owner of the Globe, Sir Matthew Brend, in order to obtain confirmation of an extension of the 31-year lease originally granted by Sir Matthew Brend's father, Nicholas Brend.

== Death ==
Burbage remained one of the keepers of the Globe until his death, aged seventy-one years, in 1636, and the position appears to have been lucrative for him; he lived in a house in the parish of St. Leonard's Shoreditch.

== Portrayals in Media ==
=== On stage ===
- Billy Nevers portrays Cuthbert in & Juliet on the West End, presenting him as a fun-loving superfan of Shakespeare.
