= The Theatre =

Playhouse in London, England, 1576–1598

Coordinates: 51°31′28.5″N 0°4′48″W

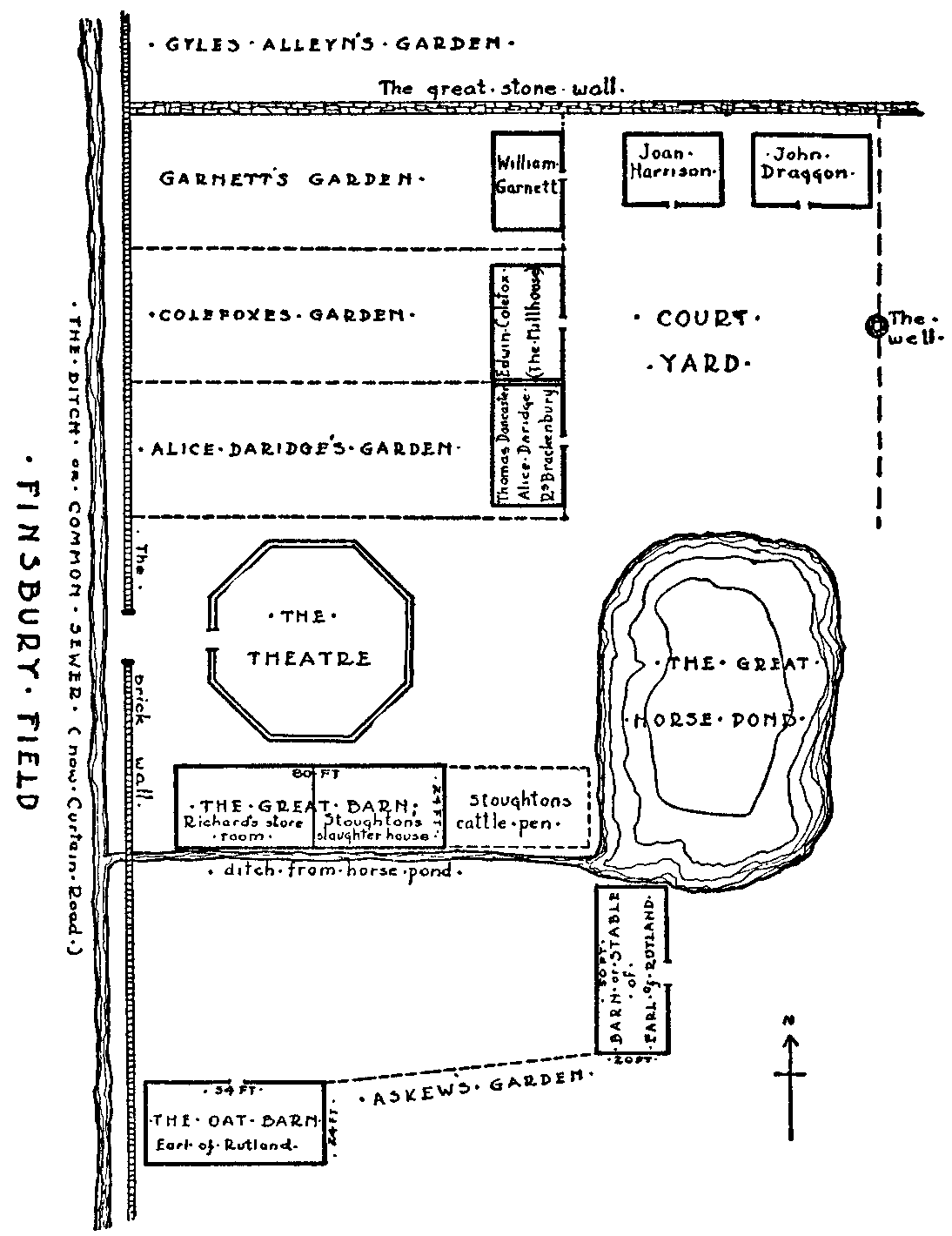
Ground plan of The Theatre. Now marked by paved streets, the "common sewer" is Curtain Road, and the "ditch from the horse-pond" is New Inn Yard

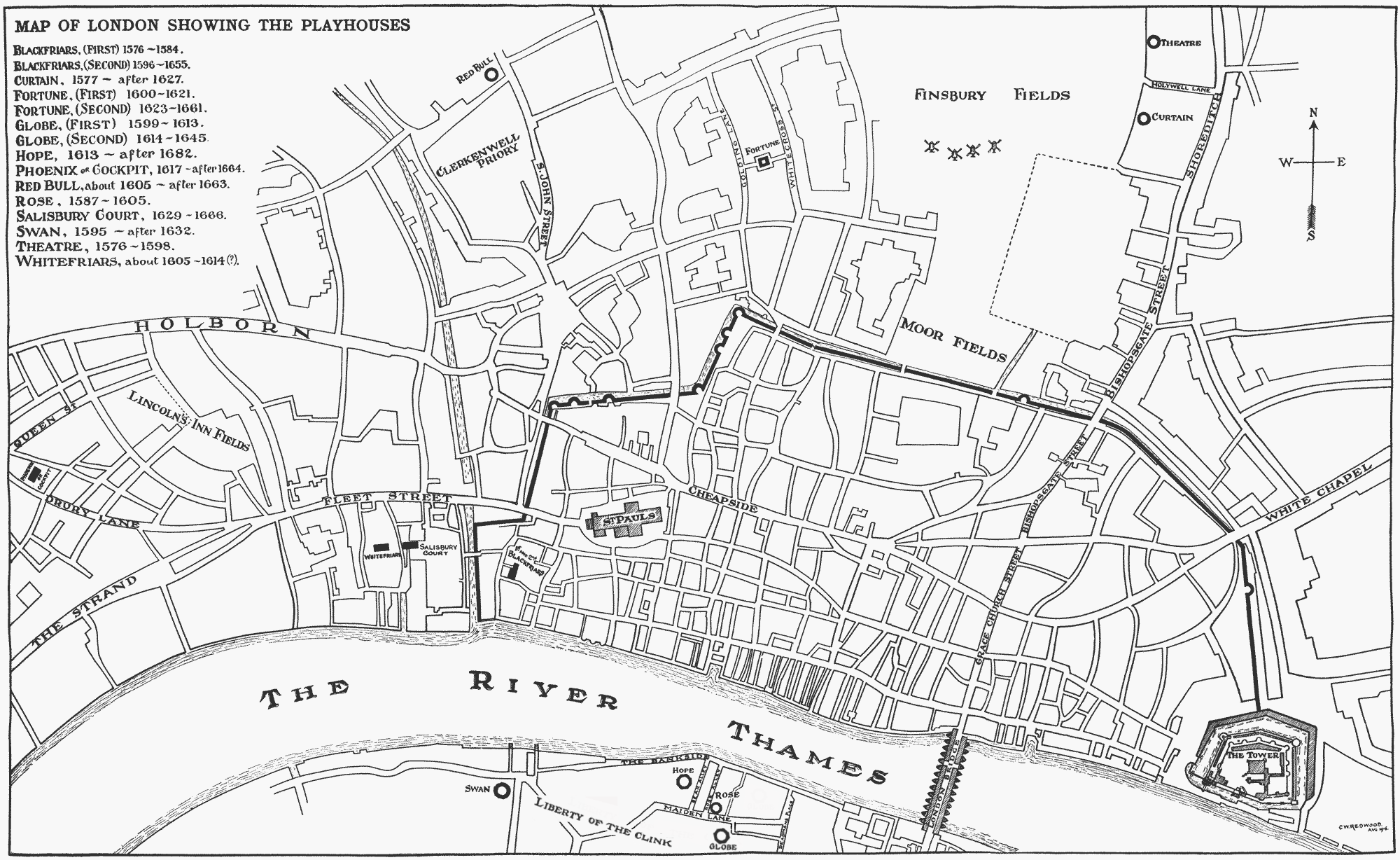
The Theatre is labelled in the top right of this London street map. Enlarge

The Theatre was an Elizabethan playhouse in Shoreditch (in Curtain Road, part of the modern London Borough of Hackney), just outside the City of London. Built in 1576, after the Red Lion, it was the first permanent theatre built exclusively for the showing of theatrical productions in England, and its first successful one. Actor-manager James Burbage built it near the family home in Holywell Street. The Theatre's history includes a number of important acting troupes including the Lord Chamberlain's Men, which employed Shakespeare as actor and playwright. After a dispute with the landlord, the theatre was dismantled and the timbers used in the construction of the Globe Theatre on Bankside.

== History ==
The Mayor and Corporation of London banned plays in 1572 as a measure against the plague, not wanting to attract crowds of strangers. In 1575 they formally expelled all players from the city. This prompted the construction of playhouses outside the jurisdiction of London, in the liberties of Halliwell/Holywell in Shoreditch and later the Clink, and at Newington Butts near the established entertainment district of St. George's Fields in rural Surrey. The Theatre was constructed in 1576 by James Burbage in partnership with his brother-in-law, one John Brayne, (the owner of the Red Lion) on property that had originally been the grounds of the dissolved Halliwell Priory (or Holywell). Brayne had advanced Burbage the money needed to build The Theatre, and in return, Brayne received a portion of the profits and owned some of the property (Burbage married Brayne's sister Ellen in 1575). The Theatre was in Shoreditch, beyond the northern boundary of the City of London and outside the jurisdiction of civil authorities, who were often opposed to theatre. This area in the "suburbs of sin" was notorious for licentious behaviour, brothels and gaming houses. A year later, the Curtain Theatre was built nearby, making the area London's first theatrical and entertainment district. "When Burbage and Brayne mortgaged The Theatre, Brayne had just recently resolved another fight with one of his brothers-in-law over a different mortgage" Brayne and Burbage had never written a contract, which eventually led to many quarrels concerning who spent what on getting The Theatre started.

Throughout the building of The Theatre, Burbage and Brayne continually became indebted to each other. To fix this they constructed schemes to keep the building of The Theatre going. John Hind was one of the creditors for the construction of The Theatre, however, almost nothing else is known about him except that there was also a contract between him and Burbage/Brayne which entailed that he arrange players for them. One of their schemes was to put on plays in The Theatre while it was still being built, to raise money for further construction.

Although Burbage's son later claimed the Theatre as the first permanent playhouse in the London conurbation, it may not have been the first permanent theatre to serve Londoners. The Newington Butts Theatre may have been built as early as 1575, certainly actor Jerome Savage renewed a lease on the site on 25 March 1576, three weeks before Burbage's lease in Shoreditch. Newington Butts was clearly established by Lady Day 1577, and Wickham et al. interpret the available documents as saying that Savage was adapting an existing building constructed by Richard Hicks rather than building from scratch.

The design of The Theatre was possibly adapted from the inn-yards that had served as playing spaces for actors and/or bear baiting pits. The building was a polygonal wooden building with three galleries surrounding an open yard. From one side of the polygon extended a thrust stage. The Theatre is said to have cost £700 to construct, which is a considerable sum for the age.

The open yard in front of the stage was cobbled and provided standing room for those who paid a penny. For another penny, the attendees were allowed into the galleries where they could either stand or, for a third penny, procure a stool. One of the galleries, though sources do not state which, was divided into small compartments that could be used by the wealthy and aristocrats. The playhouse was a timber building with a tile roof; other materials used to construct the Theatre were brick, sand, lime, lead, and iron. Owing to a lack of paperwork not much is truly known about the Theatre's appearance, but it has been described as an "amphitheater".

The Theatre opened in the autumn of 1576, possibly as a venue for Leicester's Men, the acting company of Robert Dudley, 1st Earl of Leicester of which James Burbage was a member. In the 1580s the Admiral's Men, of which James Burbage's son, Richard was a member, took up residence. After a disagreement between the company and young Burbage, most of the company left for the Rose Theatre which was under the management of Philip Henslowe.

In 1594, Richard Burbage became the leading actor of the Lord Chamberlain's Men which performed at The Theatre until 1597. Poet, playwright and actor William Shakespeare was also in the employ of the company and some of his early plays had their première at The Theatre. "At Christmas 1594 [Richard] was summoned with two other members of his company, William Kempe and William Shakespeare, to act before the queen at Greenwich Palace... Numerous performances before Queen Elizabeth followed, and Shakespeare doubtless often accompanied Burbage on many subsequent professional visits to one or other of the royal palaces." Richard's most noted role is—which holds close to his namesake — his part as Richard in Shakespeare's Richard III. After the Burbages stripped The Theatre of its materials to erect The Globe, many of Shakespeare's plays were performed at the famous theatre in the summer and the Blackfriars house, another of the Burbage's theatres, was used as a winter playhouse.

Towards the end of 1596, problems arose with the property's landlord, Giles Allen. Consequently, in 1597, the Lord Chamberlain's Men were forced to stop playing at The Theatre and moved to the nearby Curtain. The lease had been granted to Richard Burbage and his brother Cuthbert Burbage upon the death of their father. The lease that the late James Burbage had obtained from Allen in 1576 was to last only twenty years, but when that day did come, in 1596, Allen "stipulated that the playhouse should only be applied to theatrical purposes for another five years. This stipulation was contested by Burbage, and he and his sons began a harassing lawsuit with Allen. But before the dispute had gone very far Burbage died (in the spring of 1597) and the suit was continued by his sons Richard and Cuthbert." The sight of the deserted Theatre prompted these lines from a minor satirist of the day:

...But see yonder,
One like the unfrequented Theatre
Walks in dark silence and vast solitude.

— Edward Guilpin, Skialetheia, 1598

Brayne's widow, Margaret Brayne, and former business partner, Robert Myles, filed a lawsuit against the Burbages after Brayne's death in 1586. When Brayne passed the Burbages halted their payments to Margaret for their debt. When they filed lawsuit, Margaret and Robert showed up at The Theatre demanding half of everything inside of it—in disagreement, Richard Burbage physically assaulted Robert Myles, and Robert and Margaret left empty handed. However, this was not the end as Myles attempted to bring down the Burbages in another two lawsuits, which both ended in failure. "The old disputes of the Theatre were overtaken by the new litigation of the Alleyns-the original owners, when the Burbages dismantled the Theatre and rebuilt it as the Globe." At the time of Margaret Brayne's death there were still lawsuits that had not been settled, and in her last will and testament she left all of her prospective winnings to Robert Myles.

Though Giles Allen was the landlord John Hyde legally owned the lease to the Theatre and would return the lease to Richard and Cuthbert Burbage and Margaret Brayne for the sum of £30. Cuthbert then went to Walter Cope, a trusted business man, and had Cope ask Hyde if Cuthbert could outright pay for the lease and own it himself. Cuthbert paid and outright owned the lease now, ultimately squeezing Margaret Brayne out of the business. They justified this by stating that now that the lease was in Cuthbert's name and no longer in James’ name John Brayne had no dealings with the Theatre and therefore neither did Margaret Brayne.

This state of affairs forced the Burbage brothers to take drastic action to save their investment. In defiance of the landlord and with the help of their friend and financial backer William Smith, chief carpenter Peter Street and ten or twelve workmen, they dismantled the theatre on the night of 28 December 1598 and moved the structure piecemeal to Street's yard near to Bridewell. With the onset of more favourable weather in the following spring, the material was ferried over the Thames to reconstruct it as The Globe. Giles Allen then sued Peter Street in January 1599 for trespassing on the property of the Theatre, stating that Street had no right to dismantle the Theatre and move the supplies. He also attempted to sue Cuthbert and Richard Burbage for trespassing.

=== Archaeological investigation ===
In August 2008, archaeologists from the Museum of London excavating in New Inn Broadway, Shoreditch, announced that they had found the foundation of a polygonal structure they believed to be the remains of the north-eastern corner of The Theatre. The Theatre and Shakespeare's involvement with it are commemorated by two plaques on 86–90 Curtain Road, the building at the corner with New Inn Yard currently occupied by a Foxtons office. The remains of the theatre are listed as a scheduled monument.

== See also ==
- List of English Renaissance theatres
- Inn-yard theatre
- Curtain Theatre – opened in the following year further down Curtain Road
- Globe Theatre
- The Rose
- Shakespeare's Globe
