= Red Lion (theatre) =

Elizabethan playhouse in Whitechapel

The Red Lion Theatre
- Interactive map of The Red Lion Theatre
- Address: 86 Stepney Way Whitechapel High Street; London Borough of Tower Hamlets
- Coordinates: 51°31′07″N 00°03′25″W
- Owner: John Brayne
- Capacity: standing yard with galleries
- Type: Elizabethan playhouse

Construction
- Years active: 1567–1568
- Architects: William Sylvester and John Reynolds (carpenters)

The Red Lion was an Elizabethan playhouse located in Whitechapel (part of the modern Borough of Tower Hamlets), just outside the City of London on the east side.

Built in 1567 for John Brayne, citizen and grocer, this was the first known attempt to provide a purpose-built playhouse in London for the many Tudor age touring theatrical companies—and perhaps the first purpose-built venue known to have been built in the city since Roman times. Theatre historian Andrew Gurr regards its establishment as the forerunner and stimulus for all commercial theatre in London. Its existence, however, was short-lived.

== Description ==
The Red Lion had been a farm, but artefacts (ceramic cups and wine-serving vessels) recovered during archaeological excavations between 2013 and 2025 suggest that at the time of its conversion to a theatre it was in use as a tavern. The alterations were described in records from the Court of the King's Bench and the court of the Worshipful Company of Carpenters, detailing a dispute between Brayne and William Sylvester and John Reynolds (or Raynolds), two of the carpenters. The documents specified: a single-galleried rectangular theatre (constructed by Reynolds), with Sylvester making a fixed stage 40 feet (12 m) by 30 feet (9 m) standing 5 feet (1.5 m) above the audience. The stage was equipped with a trapdoor, and an attached 30-foot (9 m) turret. The construction cost £20, with an additional £8 10s for the stage. (Note: According to researcher Herbert Berry, the court documents refer to the work of both the experienced carpenter Sylvester and the novice Reynolds. They both made scaffolds for, respectively, the spectators' galleries and the stage, but without distinguishing who supplied which. The sums of money at issue in the case may not be an accurate reflection of the full construction costs, as they may not include the value of materials and workers supplied by Brayne himself.)

While it appears to have been a commercial success, the Red Lion offered little that the prior tradition of playing in inns had not offered. Situated in open farmland, it was too far from its audiences to be attractive for visiting in the winter. Records of the Court of King’s Bench show that it was an enclosed, walled construction, and was up and running before July 1567. The only play known to have been presented here was The Story of Samson, after some corrections had been made to the structure, and there is little documentary evidence that the playhouse survived beyond the summer season of 1567, although the lawsuit, from the little we know of it, dragged on until 1578.

The structure, with several alterations, remained in use, probably for animal baiting displays, until the 1690s or 1700s. The spectator galleries, however, were demolished: the archaeological investigation demonstrated that they were dismantled within 20 years, with dateable evidence found in the post hole infill.

The venture was soon replaced by a more successful collaboration between Brayne and his brother-in-law, the actor-manager James Burbage (husband of Ellen Brayne), at Shoreditch, known as The Theatre. The Red Lion was a receiving house for touring companies, whereas The Theatre accepted long-term engagements, essentially in repertory, with companies being based there. The former was a continuation of the tradition of touring groups, performing at inns and grand houses, the latter a radically new form of theatrical engagement.

== Court records ==
The little that is known of the Red Lion comes principally from the lawsuits between Brayne and his carpenters, and also with Edward Stowers, a blacksmith of Averstone, Essex (the modern Alphamstone). Edward Stowers was John Brayne's brother-in-law, being married to his sister Margaret Brayne. The suit concerned 6 acres (2.4 hectares) of land straddling the Essex-Suffolk border, and alleged that Brayne raised a mortgage on the land, by trickery, to fund the building of the Red Lion. Separate actions were brought against the carpenters. These sources were published and explored by E.K. Chambers (1923) and J.S. Loengard (1983).

On 15 July 1567, John Brayne made the following complaint before the Court of the Carpenters' Company about the standard of the work of William Sylvester, the carpenter who built the Red Lion Theatre scaffolds:

"Court holden the 15th day of July 1567... by Master William Ruddock, Master Richard More, Henry Whreste, and Richard Smarte, wardens, and Master Bradshaw. (Memorandum that) where certain variance, discord, and debate was between William Sylvester, carpenter, on the one party and John Brayne, grocer, on the other party, it is agreed, concluded, and fully determined by the said parties, by the assent and consent of them both with the advice of the master and wardens above said, that William Buttermore, John Lyffe, William Snelling, and Richard Kyrby, carpenters, shall with expedition go and peruse such defaults as are and by them shall be found of, in, and about such scaffolds as he the said William hath made at the house called the Red Lion in the parish of Stepney, and the said William Sylvester shall repair and amend the same with their advice substantially as they shall think good. And that the said John Brayne on Saturday next ensuing the date above written shall pay to the said William Sylvester the sum of £8 10s lawful money of England, and that after the play which is called The Story of Samson be once played at the place aforesaid the said John shall deliver to the said William such bonds as are now in his custody for the performance of the bargain. In witness whereof both parties hereunto hath set their hands."

The contract for the stage and turret is set forth in a plea brought in January 1569 in the Court of King's Bench by Brayne against John Reynolds, for 20 marks forfeit for breach of fulfilment. This describes the work to be done, with dimensions, by 8 July 1567 (9 Elizabeth I).

== Location ==
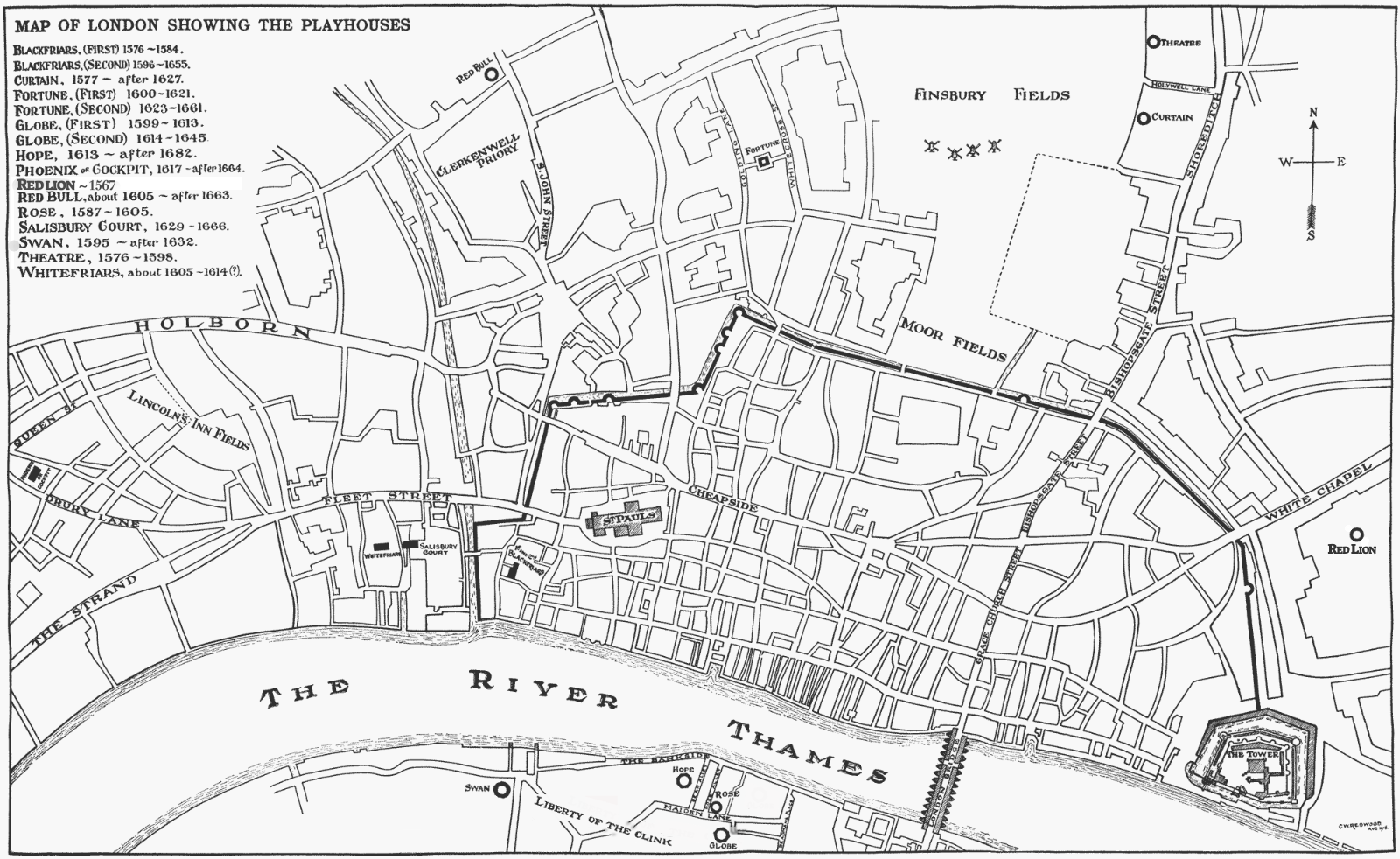
Location of the early London theatres. The Red Lion is at the far right

The playhouse is stated to have been constructed within the court or yard lying on the south side of the garden belonging to a house. The exact location remained unknown until early in 2019, when archaeological excavations associated with a building development at Stepney Way, Whitechapel (south of Whitechapel Road) discovered the remains of a rectangular structure, with dimensions corresponding to the Carpenters Company and Kings Bench court cases.

Commentators had previously suggested the eastern edge of Whitechapel, where it meets the western edge of Stepney, as the most likely location. The first reference to playing in one of the speculated locations for the Red Lion is when actors were paid to perform at Mile End (which is also within the parish of Stepney) on 6 August 1501. Attempts to locate the original site are made confusing by the various streets and public houses named "The Red Lion" (or "Lyon") which since have arisen thereabouts.

On 10 June 2020, a team of archaeologists from University College London announced that they had discovered the remains of the Red Lion theatre in Whitechapel. Their research, which had commenced in January 2019 following the exposure of a rectangular timber structure, is focused on housing redevelopment site.

Director of the dig, Stephen White from UCL's Institute of Archaeology, believes that all the indicators point to this being the site of the Red Lion: "The strength of the combined evidence – archaeological remains of buildings, in the right location, of the right period—seem to match up with characteristics of the playhouse recorded in early documents."

The site of the theatre has been made into a public open space called Red Lion Square. A pillar, marked with the height of the stage, has been erected and the outline of the building is shown in the paving stones.

== See also ==
- List of English Renaissance theatres
