= Robert Wilson (dramatist) =

16th-century English playwright and actor

- Born: c. 1540s
- Died: buried 20 November 1600
- Resting place: St. Giles, Cripplegate; City of London, England
- Occupation(s): Actor, Playwright
- Years active: (1572–1600)
- Employer: Philip Henslowe
- Organization(s): Leicester's Men; Rose Theatre
- Notable work: The Three Ladies of London (c. 1584); The Three Lords and The Three Ladies of London (c. 1590); The Cobbler's Prophecy (c. 1594)

Robert Wilson (flourished 1572 – 1600), was an Elizabethan dramatist who worked primarily in the 1580s and 1590s. He is also believed to have been an actor who specialized in clown roles.

He was connected with sixteen plays intended for Philip Henslowe's Rose Theatre, in partnership with other playwrights who also produced copy for Henslowe. While mentioned as a dramatist by Francis Meres in 1598, most existing information on his dramatic career is derived from Henslowe's papers.

Since the name is common, it is not certain that the Robert Wilson who worked for Henslowe in 1598-1600 is the same man who was a prominent actor and occasional playwright in the 1580s; yet many scholars consider it more likely than not that the records refer to one Robert Wilson and not two. If this is correct, Wilson was acting with Leicester's Men in the 1570s, and was praised along with Richard Tarlton for his "wit." He is generally accepted as the author of The Three Ladies of London (published 1584), The Three Lords and Three Ladies of London (published 1590), and The Cobbler's Prophecy (published 1594). It has been speculated that he may also have written Fair Em (c. 1590). In Palladis Tamia (1598), Francis Meres mentions Wilson along with Tarlton, and specifically connects Wilson with the Swan Theatre, which was built c. 1595.

In just over two years, from spring 1598 to summer 1600, Wilson worked with other members of Henslowe's stable of house playwrights on sixteen different plays, including three two-part projects. Several of these were never completed.

1. Earl Goodwin and his Three Sons, Parts 1 and 2, with Michael Drayton, Henry Chettle, and Thomas Dekker; March 1598.
2. Piers of Exton, with Drayton, Chettle, and Dekker; March 1598.
3. Black Bateman of the North, Parts 1 and 2, with Chettle; Part I with Dekker and Drayton also; May–June 1598.
4. The Funeral of Richard Cordelion, with Chettle, Drayton, and Anthony Munday; June 1598.
5. The Madman's Morris, with Dekker and Drayton, July 1598.
6. Hannibal and Hermes, with Dekker and Drayton, July 1598.
7. Pierce of Winchester, with Dekker and Drayton, July–August 1598.
8. Catiline's Conspiracy, with Chettle; August 1598. Apparently never completed.
9. Chance Medley, with Munday, Drayton, and Dekker or Chettle; August 1598.
10. Sir John Oldcastle, Parts 1 and 2, with Drayton, Munday, and Richard Hathwaye; Oct.-Dec. 1599.
11. Henry Richmond, Part 2, with others; never completed.
12. Owen Tudor, with Drayton, Hathwaye, and Munday; Jan. 1600. Apparently never completed.
13. Fair Constance of Rome, Part 1, with Dekker, Drayton, Hathwaye, and Munday; June 1600.

Of Wilson's collaborations for Henslowe, only the first part of Sir John Oldcastle was published, in 1600 and 1619. None of the other plays has survived. Sir John Oldcastle was commissioned as a counterblast to the negative depiction of title character in the original versions of William Shakespeare's plays Henry IV, Part 1 and Henry IV, Part 2. Objections from descendants of the historical John Oldcastle, a Protestant martyr, appears to have been responsible both for the writing of the corrective Oldcastle play and the alteration of Oldcastle to Sir John Falstaff in later versions of the Henry IV plays.

Also, Wilson has been proposed as a possible author of several anonymous Elizabethan plays, including Fair Em, The Pedlar's Prophecy, A Larum for London, Look About You, Sir Clyomon and Sir Clamydes, and A Knack to Know a Knave. On the basis of traditional literary-critical analysis and digital textual methods, Darren Freebury-Jones has proposed that the case for Wilson's authorship of A Knack to Know a Knave is compelling.

As to why a writer would work the way the Henslowe collaborators did: the careers of dramatists who worked mostly on solo projects, like Shakespeare and Ben Jonson, show that a dramatist working alone could produce one or two plays a year on a dependable basis. If one of those plays failed to sell, or flopped with the audience, the writer was severely affected. Collaborative writing spread the risk, and could provide a more certain income for a journeyman author.

A "Robert Wilson, yeoman (player)" was buried at St. Giles in Cripplegate on 20 November 1600. This is consistent with the view that the two Robert Wilsons, the player with Leicester's Men and Henslowe's dramatist, were one and the same person; it explains why Henslowe's Wilson stopped writing in 1600.
