= Leicester's Men =

The Earl of Leicester's Men was a playing company or troupe of actors in English Renaissance theatre, active mainly in the 1570s and 1580s in the reign of Elizabeth I. In many respects, it was the major company in Elizabethan drama of its time, and established the pattern for the companies that would follow: it was the first to be awarded a royal patent, and the first to occupy one of the new public theatres on a permanent basis.

== Beginnings ==
Robert Dudley, 1st Earl of Leicester had kept players as early as 1559; they can be traced through the 1560s and into the 1570s by the records of their performances in various English cities as they toured the country. When the Elizabethan Poor Laws were amended by the Vagabonds Act 1572, the status of travelling players was affected: those who did not possess sponsorship from a nobleman could be classed as vagabonds and subjected to a range of penalties. Conversely, however, those who enjoyed such sponsorship were legally more secure than they had previously been. A surviving letter to Leicester from his actors, dated 3 January 1572 and written by James Burbage for the company, requests that the actors be appointed not merely the Earl's liveried retainers but also his "household servants"—a distinction that enabled them to come and go in London without restriction. The letter also specifies that the actors would not expect any direct financial support, "any further stipend or benefit," from the Earl; they wanted to enjoy his legal protection while operating as an independent commercial entity, a model that subsequent companies would follow.

The 1572 letter was signed by Burbage, John Perkin, John Laneham, William Johnson, Robert Wilson, and Thomas Clarke. The first five men are also listed on the royal patent of 10 May 1574, the first royal patent granted to any company of players after the Vagabonds Act 1572. The Queen's warrant authorized the company "to use, exercise, and occupy the art and faculty of playing comedies, tragedies, interludes, stage plays and other such like...as well within our city of London and liberties of the same, as also within the liberties and freedoms of any our cities, towns, boroughs etc. whatsoever...throughout our Realm of England."

The warrant granted to Leicester's Men had one other crucial aspect: it cancelled earlier policies that allowed local officials to censure or disallow plays. Under the new policy, this power was vested only in the royal bureaucracy, through the Lord Chamberlain and his Master of the Revels. Once the players had the Master's approval for their plays, they could act them anywhere in England without local censorship. The warrant in effect gave the company, and those that would follow later, the freedom to create English Renaissance drama.

== Success ==
Leicester's Men performed at Court over the Christmas holidays in both 1574 and 1575. As Leicester's servants, the company also had a central role in Dudley's entertainments of Queen Elizabeth at his castle at Kenilworth in Warwickshire in 1566, 1572, and 1575. The last of these was especially noteworthy: it lasted from July 9 through July 27; its main device was The Delivery of the Lady of the Lake. Since Kenilworth lies only twelve miles northeast of Stratford-upon-Avon, it is possible that an eleven-year-old William Shakespeare was among the crowds that witnessed the event; he may later have referred to its image of "Arion on the dolphin's back" in Twelfth Night, I, ii, 15.

When James Burbage and his brother-in-law John Brayne built The Theatre, the first successful commercial public theatre in England, in 1576, Leicester's was the company that occupied its stage when performances began in the autumn of that year. The period from 1576 to 1583 was the apex of the company's fortunes.

== Decline ==
In 1583, the foundation of a new company, Queen Elizabeth's Men, stripped Leicester's Men of its three most talented and prominent members, Robert Wilson, John Laneham, and Richard Tarlton. (William Johnson may also have joined the Queen's Men at this time or soon after.) It is thought that Leicester's company was rifled of its best men deliberately, to tamp down the rivalry between Leicester and the Earl of Oxford as they expressed it through their competing companies of actors. Leicester's Men never fully recovered their former prominence and prestige after 1583.

Still, the company persevered: it was on tour in 1584 and '85. In the latter year the Earl of Leicester was appointed commander of the English troops in The Netherlands; his progress through Utrecht, Leyden and The Hague was noted for the lavish pageants that were enacted in his honor. At least one member of Leicester's Men, William Kempe, accompanied the Earl to Holland; others also may have made the journey. The company was touring again through the 1586–88 period, and performed at Court in December 1586.

With the Earl's death in 1588 Leicester's Men passed out of existence. Kempe and some other members went on to work with other companies.
