= John Brayne =

Grocer and theatre builder

Big John Brayne
- Born: c. 1541; London
- Died: June 1586 (aged 44–45); London
- Buried: St Mary Matfelon
- Spouse(s): Margaret Stowers
- Issue: Robert Brayne; Roger Brayne; John Brayne; Rebecca Brayne; Katherine Brayne
- Father: Thomas Brayne

John Brayne (c. 1541 – June 1586) was a member of the Worshipful Company of Grocers. He built the Red Lion playhouse, and financed, with his brother-in-law, James Burbage, the building of the Theatre in Shoreditch, in which he was to have had a half interest. He also leased the George Inn in Whitechapel with a friend, Robert Miles. The latter two ventures, particularly the financing of the Theatre, bankrupted him, and he fell out with both James Burbage and Robert Miles. It was suspected that his death in 1586 was caused by blows received during an altercation with Miles. His widow, Margaret, backed financially by Miles, was involved in litigation with Burbage over Brayne's half interest in the Theatre until her own death in 1593.

== Family ==
John Brayne, born in about 1541, was the eldest child of Thomas Brayne (d.1562), a London tailor. He had a sister, Ellen Brayne (c. 1542–1613), who on 23 April 1559 married James Burbage (c. 1531–1597).

== Early career ==
On 13 March 1554 he was apprenticed to the London grocer John Bull. After completing his apprenticeship he carried on business in Bucklersbury in London, where he also had a house. On 14 January 1565 he married Margaret Stowers, by whom he had four children who were baptized at St Stephen Walbrook and died young: Robert (b.1565), Roger (b.1566), Rebecca (b.1568) and John (b.1573), and possibly a posthumous daughter, Katherine (d.1593).

In 1567 Brayne hired two carpenters to build a playhouse in the yard of the Red Lion, a farmhouse east of Aldgate near Mile End. According to Berry this was the first professional playhouse in the British Isles specifically built for that purpose 'since Roman times'. It consisted of a stage, with scaffolds for seating the audience, and Brayne is thought to have spent no more than £15 on its construction. The first play scheduled to be performed there was The Story of Sampson, on 8 July 1567, but nothing further is known about the performance or the theatre itself.

== The Theatre in Shoreditch ==
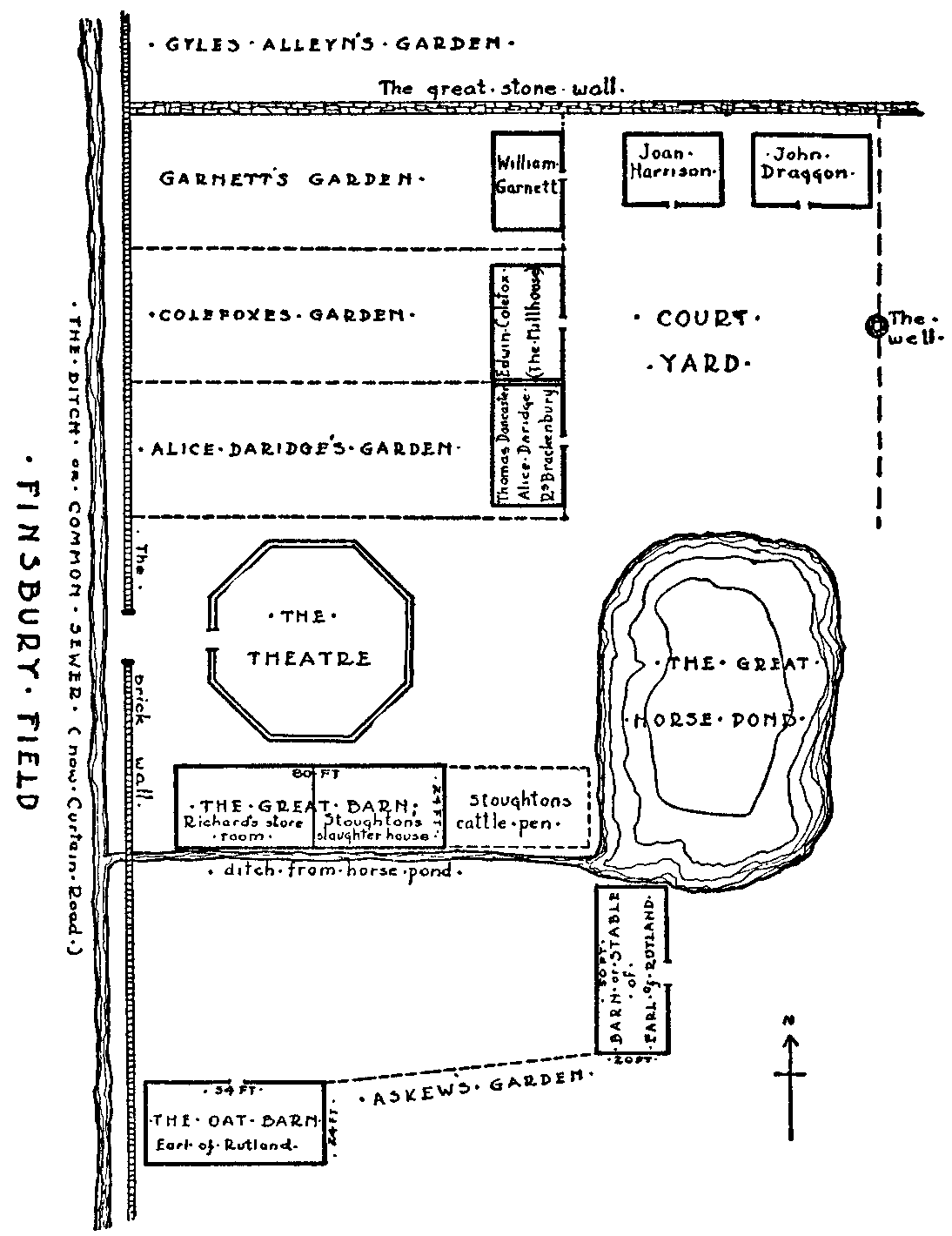
Modern drawing of ground plan of the Theatre in Shoreditch

Brayne's earliest financial involvement with his brother-in-law, James Burbage, was in 1568, when they lent money to a third party. Eight years later, on 13 April 1576, Burbage leased part of the grounds of the dissolved Holywell Priory in Shoreditch from Giles Allen for the purpose of building a playhouse. To help finance the scheme he took in Brayne as a partner, and it was later claimed that Brayne had supplied most of the £700 spent in the construction of the Theatre, and had bankrupted himself in so doing. Brayne sold his business and house in Bucklersbury, and by 1577–8 was no longer active as a grocer.

There was no written agreement governing the terms of the partnership, and Brayne and Burbage soon fell out. Brayne, who was now childless, failed to revise his will to leave his interest in the Theatre to James Burbage's children, as he had promised to do, and Burbage failed to grant Brayne a half interest in the 21-year ground lease which he had signed with Giles Allen on 13 April 1576, and kept it solely in his own name. On 9 August 1577 an assignment of lease was drawn up, and on 22 May 1578 Burbage signed a bond in the amount of £400 requiring him to assign a half interest in the ground lease to Brayne, but this was never done. Brayne accused Burbage of double-dealing, and in the following month the partners submitted their dispute to arbitration by two friends, in the course of which Burbage struck Brayne and they fell to fisticuffs. On 12 July 1578 the arbitrators submitted the articles containing their decision, and both Burbage and Brayne signed bonds in the amount of £200 as a guarantee of performance.

On 26 September 1579 Burbage borrowed £125 8s 11d from the London grocer John Hyde, in return for which he mortgaged the ground lease of the Theatre for a one-year term. Hyde was not repaid, and the ground lease was forfeited to Hyde on 27 September 1580. Hyde allowed Burbage to continue operating the Theatre and extended the lease, but it was again forfeited to Hyde for non-payment. Hyde had Burbage arrested for debt in June 1582, and tried to put Brayne out as part owner of the Theatre.

== George Inn ==
Meanwhile in January 1580 Brayne had taken a 24-year lease on the George Inn in Whitechapel, and had moved into the premises. The George was not at the time functioning as an inn, and Brayne, again without a written agreement, formed a partnership with a longtime friend, the London goldsmith Robert Miles (d.1614), to "restore the inn trade" and share both the expenses and profits. They were soon quarrelling bitterly. In order to evade his creditors for debts incurred in connection with both the Theatre and the George Inn, Brayne signed various deeds of gift of his property. He died in June 1586, allegedly as a result of blows at the hands of Robert Miles, and was buried 15 June 1586 in the churchyard at St Mary Matfelon, in Whitechapel. In his will dated 1 July 1578 he left his property to his wife, Margaret, and to his brother-in-law, Edward Stowers of Alphamstone, Essex.

== Lawsuits ==
Brayne's widow, Margaret, initially sued Miles for her share in the George Inn, and "pursued him at law for murder (he is said to have been 'tried for murder" at a coroner's inquest). She then gave birth to a daughter, Katherine, and "she and Miles became close friends". Despite this, Miles did not grant her a share in the George Inn.

At the time of Brayne's death, the only legal documents that established that he had had any financial interest in the Theatre were the two bonds which he had managed to get Burbage to sign. Burbage allowed Margaret Brayne a share of the profits for a short time, but then cut her off. At about the same time Hyde, as legal owner of the forfeited ground lease, falsely represented that he had sold his interest to his father-in-law, George Clough, and tried to remove James Burbage from the Theatre and replace him with Clough.

In early 1587 Margaret Brayne, with financial backing from Robert Miles, sued James Burbage at common law in an attempt to either recover on the bonds or obtain a half interest in the ground lease and the profits of the Theatre. In the same year the executors of Robert Gardner, to whom Brayne had made one of his deeds of gift, also sued Burbage. In the autumn of 1588 Burbage brought an action of his own against Margaret Brayne in Chancery, and Margaret Brayne then counter-sued in Chancery. The legal battles continued for a decade, with Burbage always emerging the victor.

While these lawsuits were ongoing, both James Burbage and Margaret Brayne sought to obtain an assignment of the ground lease from Hyde. In June 1589 both James and Cuthbert Burbage sought help from Cuthbert's employer, Sir Walter Cope, who accordingly wrote to Hyde suggesting that he, Cope, might be of service to Hyde with the Lord Treasurer, Lord Burghley, on some future occasion if Hyde would assign the ground lease of the Theatre to Cuthbert Burbage. With some reluctance Hyde complied, and on 7 June 1589 assigned his interest in the ground lease of the Theatre to Cuthbert Burbage. According to Wallace, James Burbage continued to manage the Theatre, and business went on much as before, "but the Theatre itself was Cuthbert's". Hyde said later that he would not have made the assignment had it not been for Cope's letter. Cuthbert Burbage was equally dissatisfied with the arrangement. He later deposed that he agreed only to save his father from debt, and was of the view that he could have used his influence with Cope to better personal advantage. He was forced to borrow money to pay Hyde, and although the amount is not known with certainty, a statement by Hyde himself indicates that it was almost the entire original debt of £125 8s 11d plus interest.

Through his ownership of the ground lease, Cuthbert Burbage was drawn further into the ongoing battles between his father and Margaret Brayne. On 4 November 1590 she obtained a court order sequestering the Theatre property until the hearing of the case; however on 13 November Cuthbert succeeded in having that order stayed, and obtained an order for performance of the 1578 arbitration. On 16 November Margaret Brayne, Robert Miles and his son Ralph, and a friend, Nicholas Bishop, took a copy of the order to the Theatre to enforce its terms by taking half the profits from the gallery that day. They arrived just as playgoers were flocking in for a performance. James Burbage, after initial argument through a window of the Theatre, came down into the yard and called Robert Miles a knave and a rascal, and the widow Brayne a "murdering whore". According to Berry, they believed that "Miles was Katherine Brayne's father and that he and Margaret Brayne had conspired to kill her husband".

James Burbage's wife and her son Richard Burbage, then only about nineteen, came into the yard and beat Robert Miles with a broomstaff. Richard Burbage, after "scornfully and disdainfully playing with Nicholas Bishop's nose", threatened to beat him also. At that point Cuthbert Burbage arrived, and threatened the intruders with "great and horrible oaths". They were then violently thrust out of the yard. Some of the actors were attracted by the tumult, among them John Alleyn, brother of Edward Alleyn, who also put in a word for the widow Brayne, to no avail. The Admiral's Men, of which the Alleyn brothers were members, subsequently withdrew from the Theatre and went across the river to play at Henslowe's theatre. On 28 November Margaret Brayne had James Burbage arrested for being in contempt of the court order, and for the next two or three years there was a lengthy investigation into the contempt issue which was still ongoing when Margaret Brayne died of plague in late April 1593. In her will dated 8 April she made Robert Miles her sole executor and left him the care of her daughter Katherine (insisting, however, that Katherine was John Brayne's daughter), and all her property, including her half interest in the Theatre, and Miles thereby inherited the litigation in which he had already been active as her financial backer. Miles filed a bill of reviver near the end of the year and continued the suit in Chancery until 28 May 1595, when the court finally adjudged that he should attempt to collect on the bonds in the common law courts, which he appears not to have attempted.

James Burbage died in February 1597, and two months later the ground lease on the Theatre expired, Giles Allen having refused to renew it. At this point Miles brought an action against Cuthbert Burbage in the Court of Requests, the outcome of which is not known as the relevant documents are no longer extant. In December 1598 Cuthbert and Richard Burbage had the Theatre pulled down, and took the timbers across the Thames to Southwark, where they were used in the building of the Globe.
