= James Burbage =

16th-century English theatre impresario

- Born: c. 1531; England, Kingdom of England
- Died: 2 February 1597 (aged c. 66)
- Burial place: London, England, United Kingdom
- Occupations: Actor; theatre impresario; joiner; builder
- Known for: Building The Theatre
- Spouse: Ellen Burbage (nee Brayne)
- Children: Cuthbert, Richard, Ellen, and Alice

James Burbage (c. 1531 – 2 February 1597) was an English actor, theatre impresario, joiner, and theatre builder in the English Renaissance theatre. He built The Theatre, the first permanent dedicated theatre built in England since Roman times.

== Life ==
James Burbage was born around 1531, probably in Bromley in Kent. He was apprenticed in London to the trade of joiner, and must have persevered through his apprenticeship and taken up his freedom, as in 1559 he was referred to as a joiner twice in the register of St Stephen's, Coleman Street. He was also one of the greatest at the craft of carpentry, which gave him an advantage at his start of theatrical management later in his life.

=== Career ===
Burbage took up acting and was the leader of Leicester's Men by 1572. Burbage had various talents, e.g. an actor, builder, and theatre owner; he was heavily involved in groups concerning theatre. He was said to be a theatre professional "who bridged the gap between late-medieval drama in London and the flowering of the great Elizabethan Theatre." Burbage was described as handsome in appearance, charming in manner, honest, tactful, and witty by Sir Robert Dudley, patron of Leicester's Men. Another professional acquaintance depicted James as more motivated by commerce than by art because of his dependency on financial success. He also was the father to one of Shakespeare’s personal friends, Richard Burbage, who played all the great roles in Shakespeare plays. It is possible that the young Shakespeare would have encountered James who had visited Stratford-upon-Avon with a troupe of actors on at least two occasions in the 1570s. It was his personal experience of a traveling actor's life that prompted him to establish the Theatre in Shoreditch in 1576 which he built with a loan from his brother-in-law John Brayne.

=== Family ===
Burbage married Ellen Brayne, the daughter of Thomas Brayne, a London tailor and sister of his later business partner John Brayne, on 23 April 1559. They were settled in St. Leonard's parish in Shoreditch by 1576, with residence in Halliwell Street or Holywell Lane.

Cuthbert Burbage, the elder son, followed in his father's footsteps as a theatre manager, while the younger son, Richard became one of the most celebrated actors of his era. He showed his talents alongside Shakespeare, both being co-owners of the Globe Theatre.

=== Death ===
James Burbage was buried in Shoreditch on 2 February 1597. He was buried a few hundred yards from St. Leonard's church, which is the burial ground for many other actors from this era. He died intestate (without a will). Having previously given his Blackfriars property to his son Richard and his personal property to his grandson Cuthbert, his widow presented an inventory valued at only £37. He died right before the lease expired on the Theatre, so after his passing, his son Richard took down the Theatre and rebuilt it across the Thames river and called it the Globe Theatre.

== James Burbage and The Theatre ==
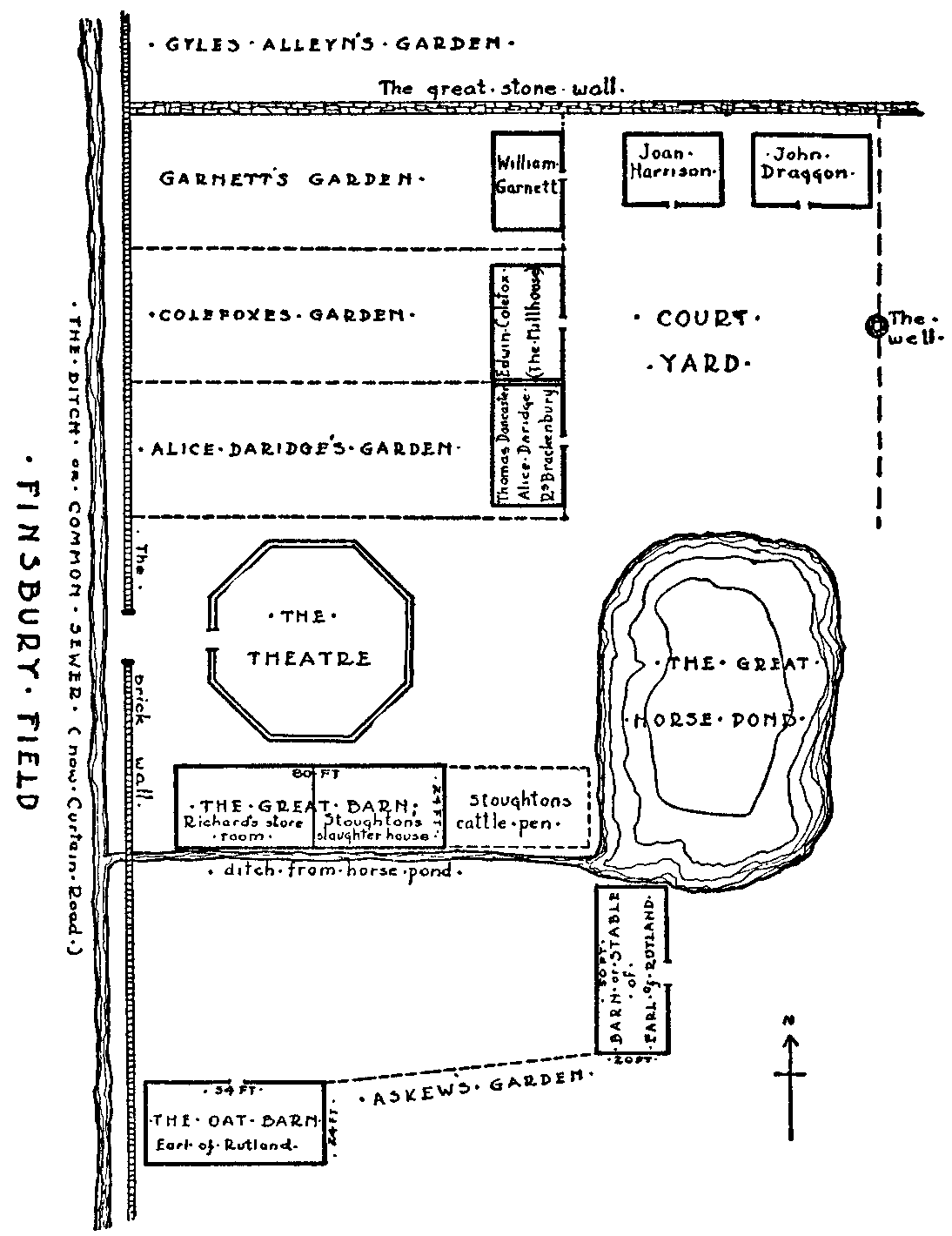
Ground plan of The Theatre

In 1576, Burbage and his partner John Brayne decided to create a new, permanent stage for London acting groups. It was one of the first permanent theatres to be built in London since the time of the Romans. The decision was born out of necessity, as the Lord Mayor had forbidden performances both in inns and in open spaces in the city. A dedicated building to perform in allowed Burbage to avoide the Lord Mayor's jurisdiction while obeying the law to the letter.

Brayne was Burbage's brother-in-law and was considered a wealthy man. It was his investment (and the mortgage Burbage took out on the lease of the grounds) that allowed The Theatre to be built, with the two sharing the profits equally. Financial difficulties led Burbage and Brayne to stage plays in the building before construction was complete; the proceeds from these plays helping to finance the building's completion.

Despite partnering with John Brayne, the lease of The Theatre's site was signed by Burbage alone on 13 April 1576, to begin on 25 March 1576. Since Burbage owned the lease, he also received rent money for properties on the site. Under this lease, he paid roughly £14 a year. The exact builder of The Theatre is unknown, though a likely candidate is James Burbage's brother Robert, who was a carpenter.

In 1594, a Privy Council order created the Lord Chamberlain's Men and gave it exclusive rights to play in the City of London at The Theatre. However, the lease on the land on which The Theatre was built would expire in1597. Burbage had not agreed a renewal with the landlord and invested instead in the building of the Blackfriars Theatre.

=== Performance at The Theatre ===
Burbage was very confident that spectators would come to The Theatre, even if they had to go through open fields to get there. One contemporary of the time referred to people streaming out of the city to see the plays there. The Theatre was considered a grand classical name. It was made mostly of wood, with ironwork scattered throughout. There was a tiring house for the players, and galleries and luxury seats providing better viewing and privacy. These seats would typically cost an extra penny or two pence, as opposed to a penny for the average attendee.

The Theatre was tested by the appearance of another playhouse, the Curtain Theatre, placed only 200 yards closer to the city walls. It was built by Henry Lanman (or Laneham), who had a close business relationship with Burbage and his associates. The two theatres pooled their profits together between the proprietors, using the Curtain Theatre to ease people into the more complex performances at The Theatre. As time went on, the shows in these playhouses became better organized, more popular, resourceful, and sophisticated in production. More playhouses such as The Rose and The Swan were built.

== The Blackfriars ==
On 4 February 1596 Burbage purchased the Blackfriars Theatre property for £600. The building had once been a Dominican monastery in the south-west corner of London, but Burbage had plans to renovate the building into the English-speaking world's first permanent, purpose-built indoor theatre. However, in November 1596, the residents of the district, led by Lady Elizabeth Russell, petitioned and managed to win a ban on play performances at the theatre. It was suggested that the stress of losing his business in this way contributed to Burbage's death the following year.
