= Long View of London from Bankside =

1647 etching by Wenceslas Hollar

Long View of London from Bankside, a panorama of London by Wenceslaus Hollar, 1647, notable for being rendered all from one viewpoint.

Long View of London from Bankside is a panoramic etching made by Wenceslas Hollar in Antwerp in 1647. It depicts a panorama of London, based on drawings done while Hollar was in London in the early 1640s. Unlike earlier panoramas of London, Hollar's panorama takes a single viewpoint, the tower of St Saviour in Southwark (now Southwark Cathedral), from where he made the drawings. It shows the River Thames curving sinuously from left to right past the viewpoint.

== Background ==
Hollar was born in Prague. After spending time in Stuttgart, Strasburg, and Cologne, he travelled with Thomas Howard, 21st Earl of Arundel to Vienna and Prague and then accompanied Lord Arundel when he returned to England in 1627. Hollar created a 3 feet (0.91 m) long "View of Greenwich" in his first year in England, and a similar panoramic drawing in two parts has survived from 1638. He remained in the Earl's household in England for several years.

Lord Arundel was a recusant Roman Catholic; he left England in 1642 on a diplomatic mission and did not return before his death in 1646. Hollar passed into the service of the Duke of York (later King James II), but Hollar left London himself in 1644 to escape the English Civil War. After eight years in Antwerp, he returned to London in 1652, where he died in 1677.

== Print ==
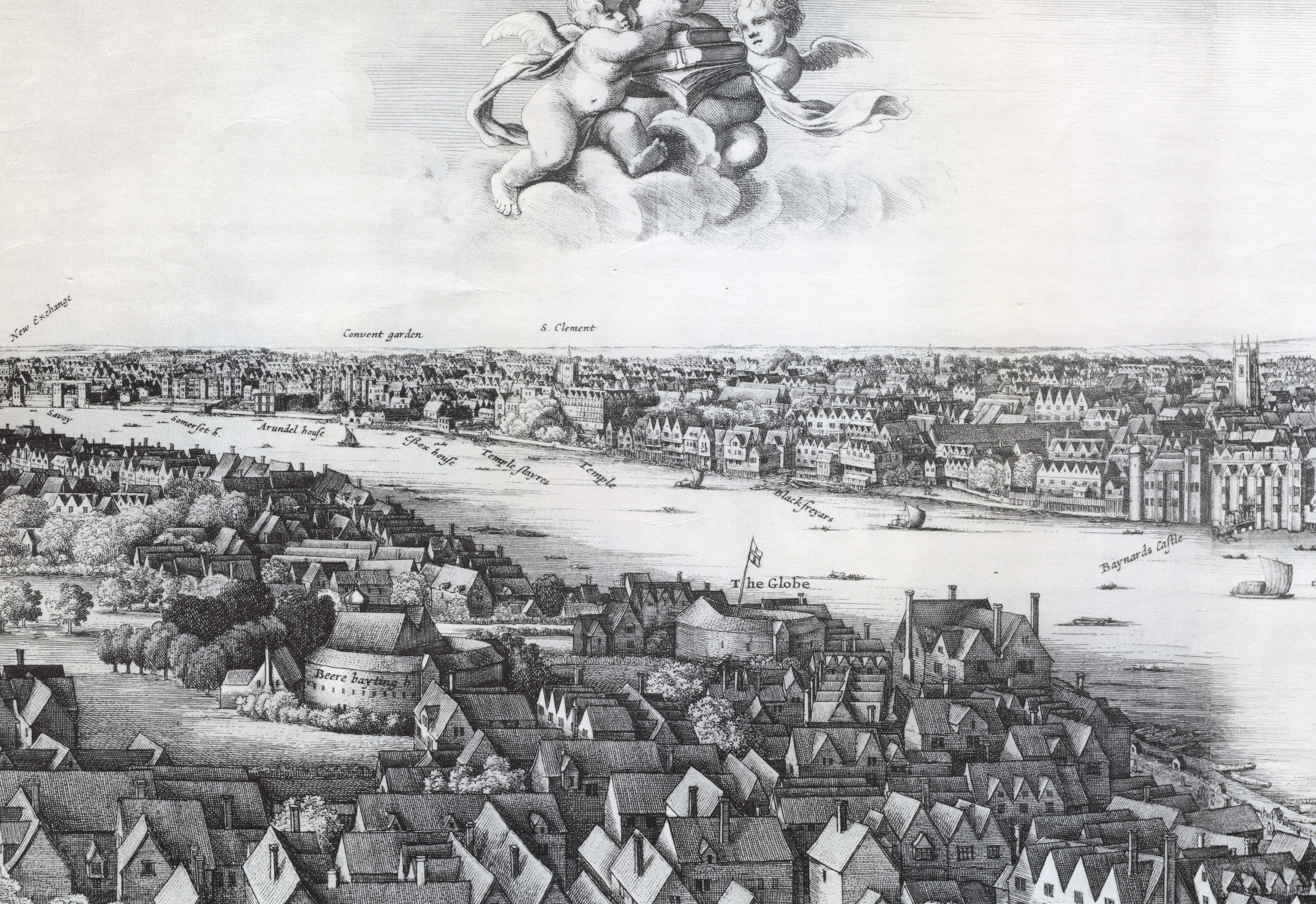
Detail: Bankside and Strand to Baynard's Castle

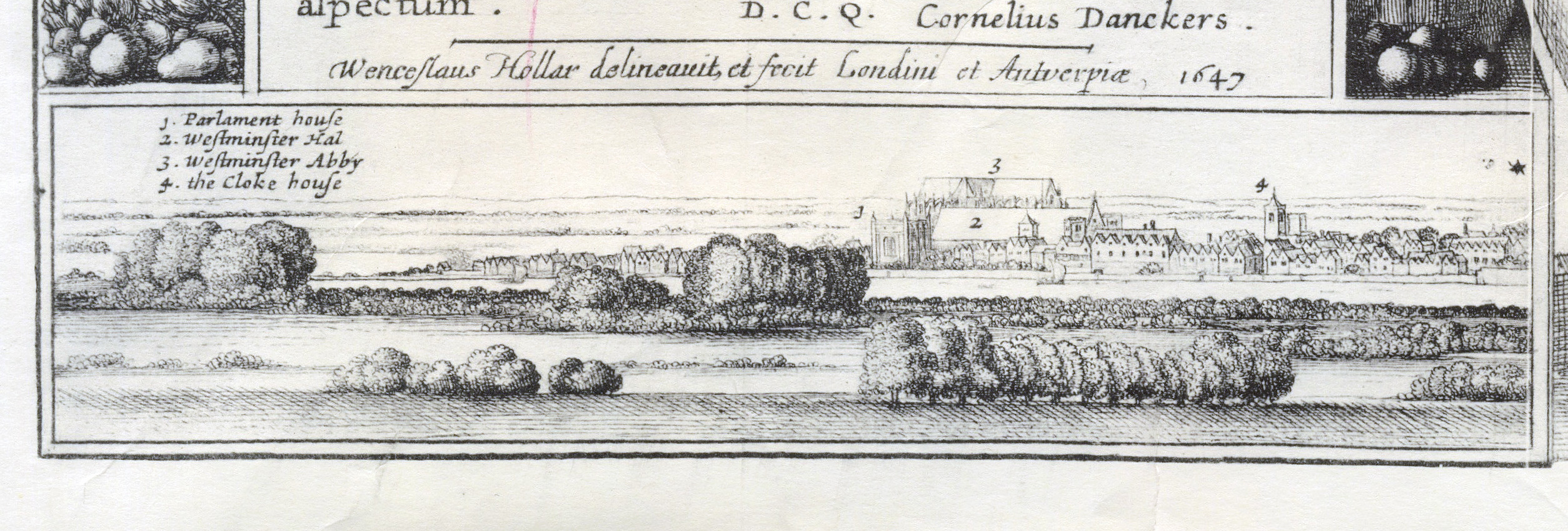
Signature, and Westminster extension (bottom left corner)

The work was etched on six plates, with the two ends printed from a single plate so the impression must be cut in half to assemble the full panorama. Each print measures about 18 inches (46 cm) by 15 inches (38 cm), so the assembled work is about 9 feet (2.7 m) long. The prints were published by Cornelis Danckerts.

The panorama includes, from left to right, on the north bank, on the first plate, the Palace of Whitehall, Scotland Yard, Suffolk House, York House, and Durham House; on the second plate, Salisbury House, the New Exchange on the Strand, the Savoy, Somerset House, Arundel House, Covent Garden, Essex House, the Temple and St Clement Danes, Blackfriars, and Baynard's Castle; on the third plate, Queenhithe, St Andrew's, Holborn, Old St Paul's Cathedral, with Highgate Hill behind in the distance; on the fourth plate, the Steelyard, Bow Church, the Guildhall, Coalharbour, All-Hallows-the-Great, St Laurence Pountney, the Royal Exchange, The Old Swan, St Michael's, St Peter's, Fishmongers' Hall, St Magnus-the-Martyr, Old London Bridge, Greyfriars, St Dunstan-in-the-East, Billingsgate, All Hallows-by-the-Tower, the Customs House, the Tower of London, and meanders of the River Thames past St Katharine Docks towards Greenwich. On the south bank are the Bankside theatres the Globe and Hope (mislabelled), Winchester House, Southwark, and St Olave's. Each large sheet frames a particular view: the Bankside theatres, St Paul's Cathedral, the City and Southwark, the Bridge, and the Tower. Downstream of London Bridge, the Pool of London throngs filled with a variety of ocean-going vessels.

The view is not entirely accurate, with some alignments adjusted for aesthetic effect. For example, St Paul's Cathedral is depicted too far west, and St Olave's in line with the Tower. Hollar's dependence on old drawings is demonstrated by the presence of the Globe Theatre (mislabelled as "Beere bayting", that is the Beargarden) in a print made three years after it was demolished. Copying an error in the 1616 Visscher panorama, the round theatre labelled "The Globe" is actually the Hope). The Swan and the Rose theatres had fallen into disuse by the 1630s.

Various decorative elements are arranged around the scene. To the lower left of the first plate is a symbolic figure representing the law (with a sword) above a dedication to Princess Mary, daughter of King Charles I, and a poem to "Nympha Britannorum", with an inset panel denoted with an asterisk continuing the panorama to the left past Westminster Hall and Westminster Abbey; overhead are three cherubs, one wearing a lion skin. The second plate has three cherubs in the sky with a pile of books, and one bearing aloft a caduceus. Above St Paul's in the third plate is a figure of Mercury in Roman costume, with winged boots and hat, holding a caduceus. The central fourth plate has a large decorative cartouche with the word "LONDON" with the arms of the City of London and lion supporters. A winged figure, possibly Fame, blows a trumpet at the top of the fifth plate. The sixth plate has three more cherubs, carrying a chain, a crown, a jewel chest, and a bird. The seventh plate has a river god above a 34 line Latin poem by Edward Benlowes, with another cherub in the sky above, dressed as an American Indian and leading with an ostrich.

Hollar's panorama was preceded by the Visscher panorama of 1616, which straightens out the river so buildings on each bank are displayed in a line, and John Norden's Civitas Londini of 1600, both of which are composite drawings made from a variety of different viewpoints. Hollar published another panorama of London and Westminster in 1666, showing views of the city from Lambeth "before" and "after" Great Fire of London.

Two of Hollar's preliminary sketches were sold at Sotheby's in 1931, and are now held by the Yale Center for British Art.

A 1661 reprint by Justus Danckerts has a few changes, with a maypole in Covent Garden, a dome for St Paul's, and the Monument. An accurately copied lithograph was printed by Robert Martin in 1832.
