= Panorama of London =

The city of London has long been a subject for panoramas by artists, mapmakers, and topographers. Many of their works have this as their title.

== History ==
The earliest topographical drawings preceded maps according to modern definition, although they were mainly based on surveys or multiple drawings reduced to a (fairly) consistent perspective, as it is clearly impossible for them to have been produced from any single real viewpoint, unlike modern photographic panoramas. Wenceslaus Hollar's 1647 Long View of London from Bankside is an exception. Projected from a single viewpoint it resembles the perspective of a modern panoramic photograph.

== Panoramas ==
Amongst the earliest known is that by Flemish topographer Anton van den Wyngaerde, produced in 1543 and published by London Topographical Society in 1881 with key added on bottom as reproduced here:

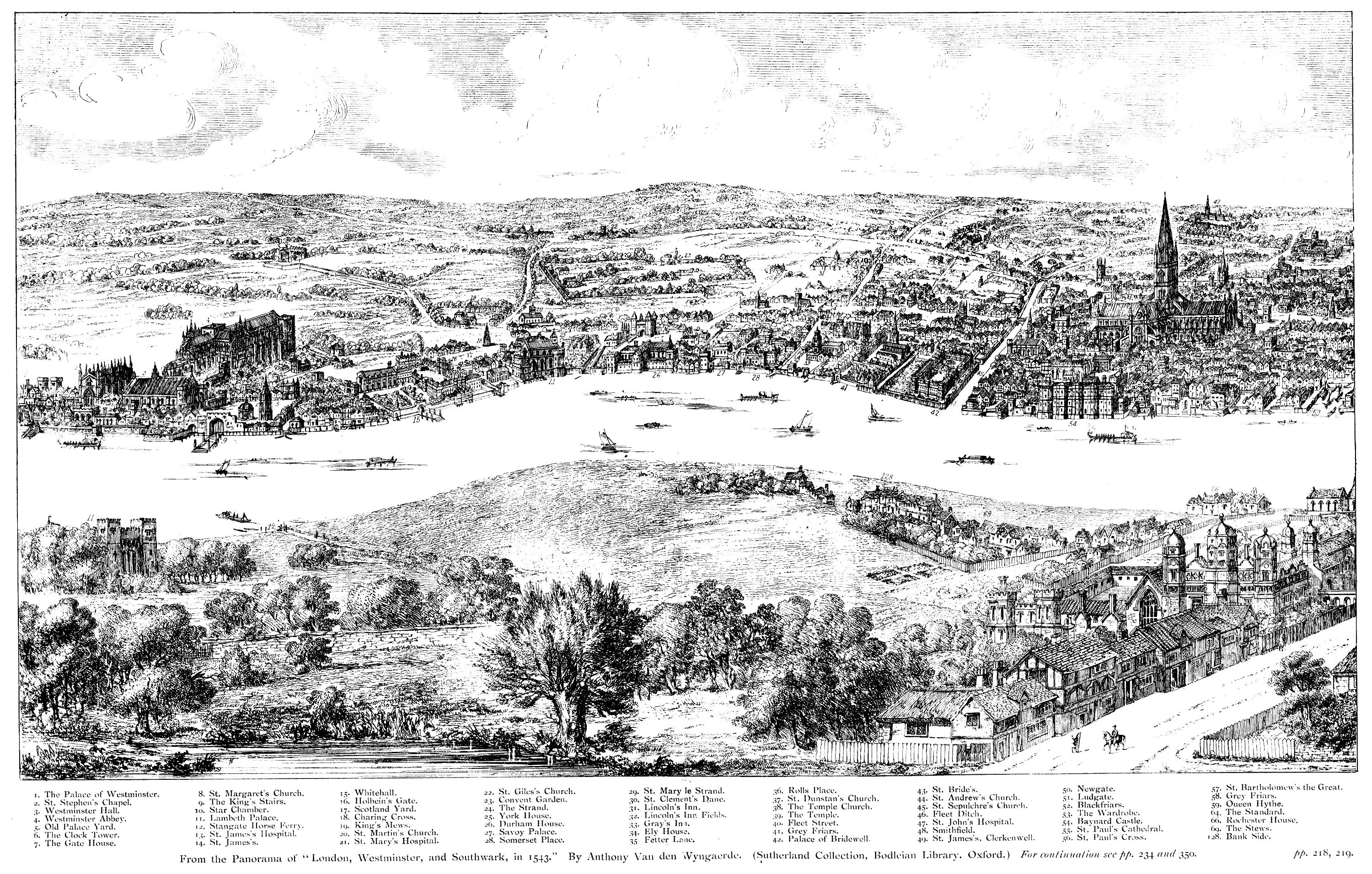
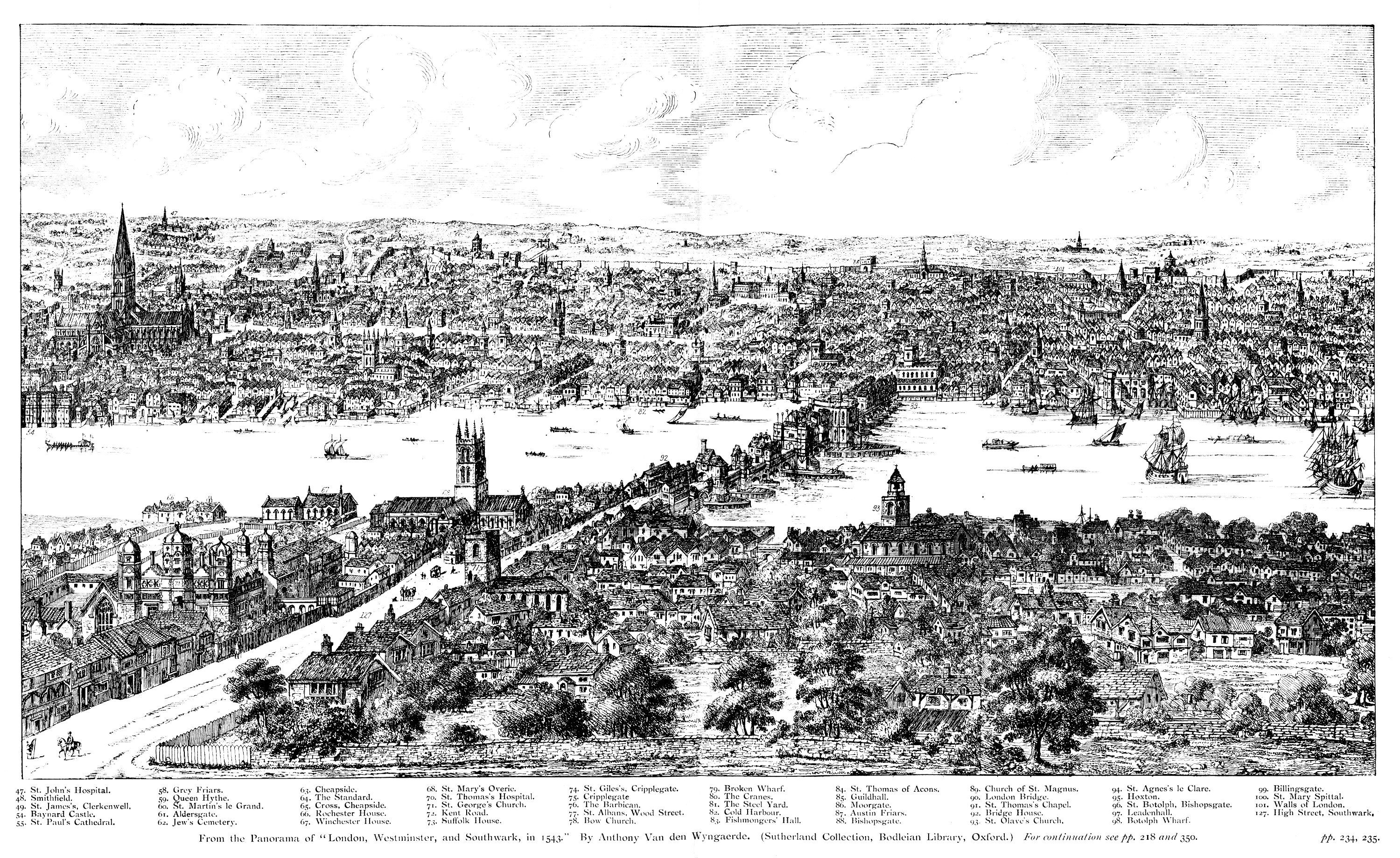
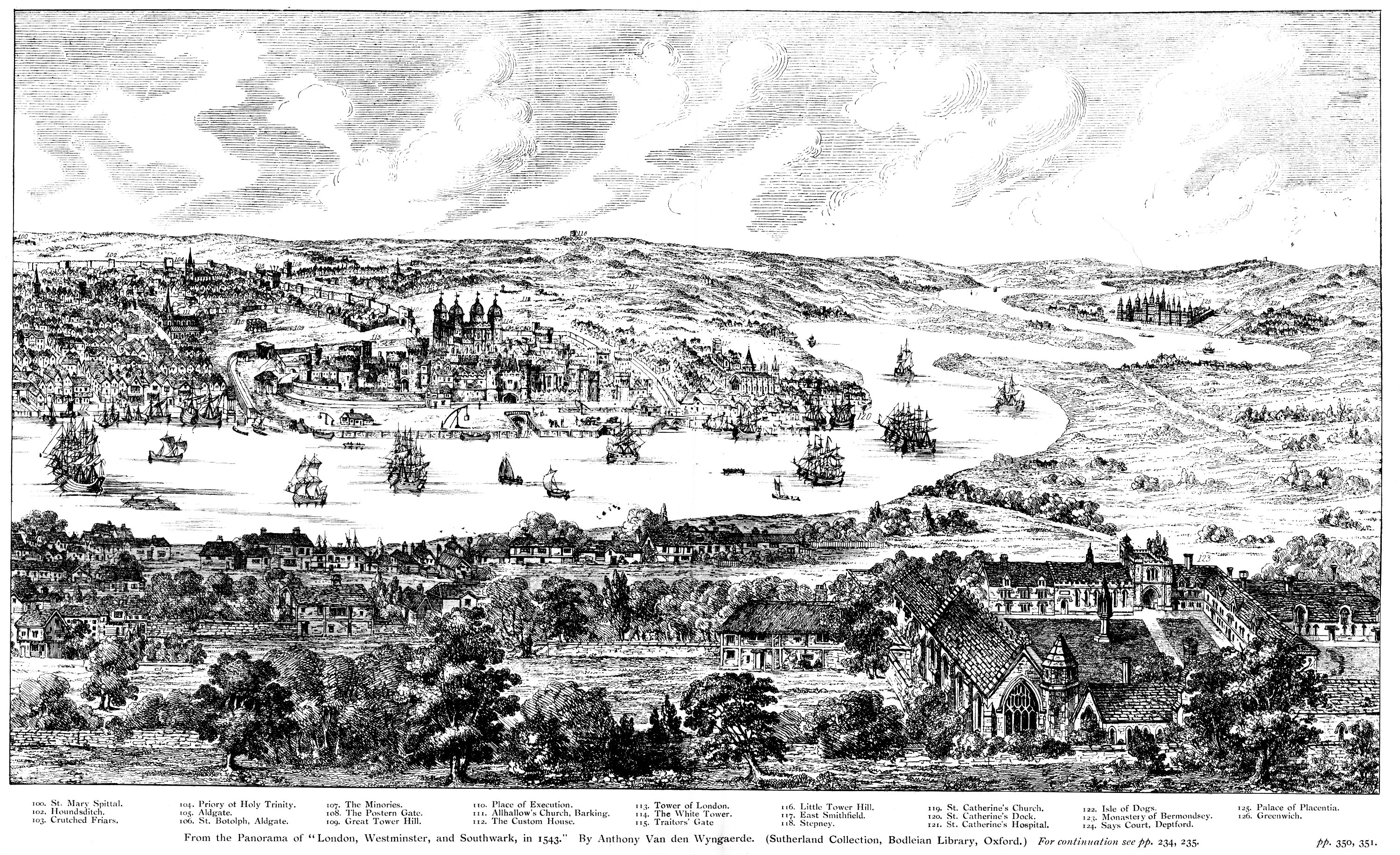
Wyngaerde's "Panorama of London in 1543"

Others include Van Visscher's of 1616:

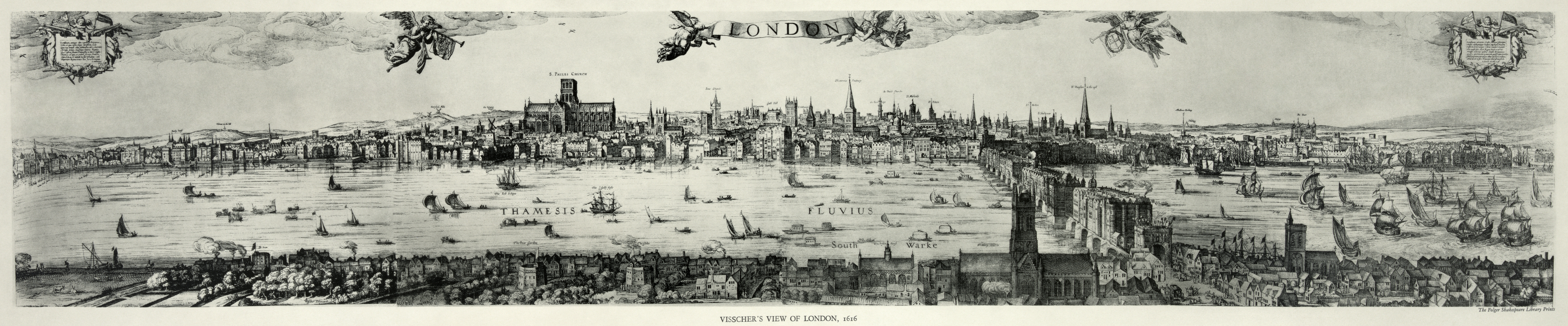
A panorama of London by Claes Van Visscher, 1616. Old St Paul's Cathedral had lost its spire by this time. The two theatres on the foreground (Southwark) side of the Thames are The Bear Garden and The Globe. The large church in the foreground is St Mary Overie, now Southwark Cathedral.

Wenceslaus Hollar's Long View of London from Bankside of 1647:

Long View of London from Bankside, a panorama of London by Wenceslaus Hollar, 1647. This panorama is notable for being rendered all from one viewpoint.

Another by Hollar, 1666

London before and after the Great fire of 1666, by Wenceslas Hollar
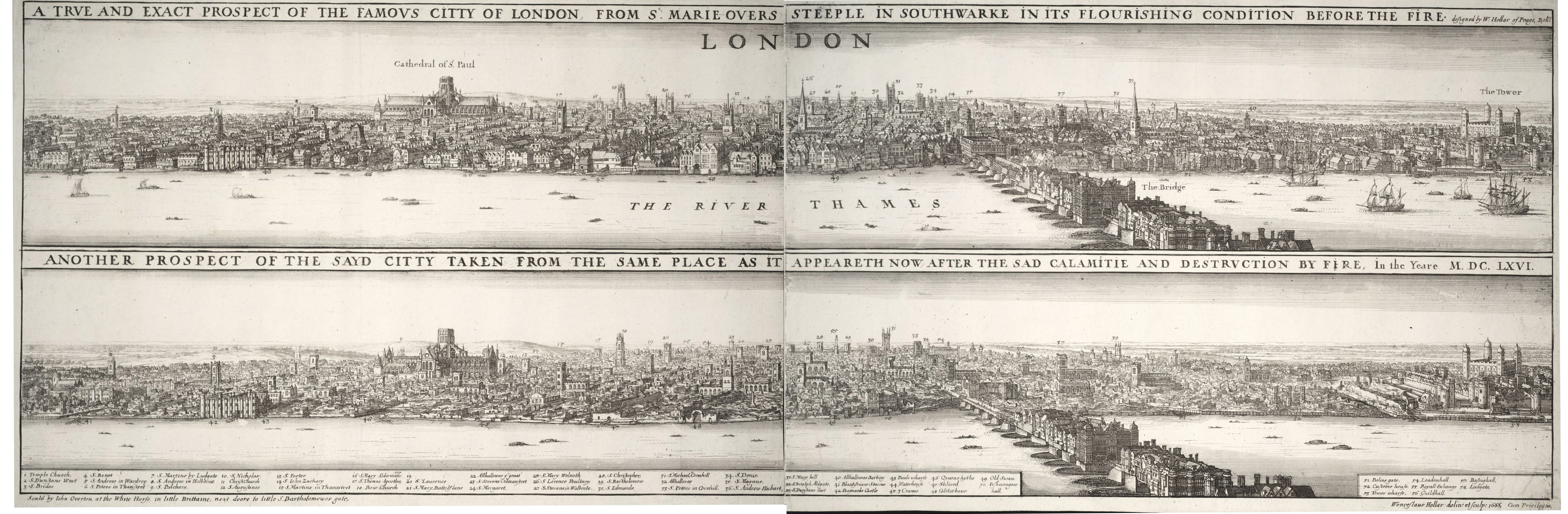
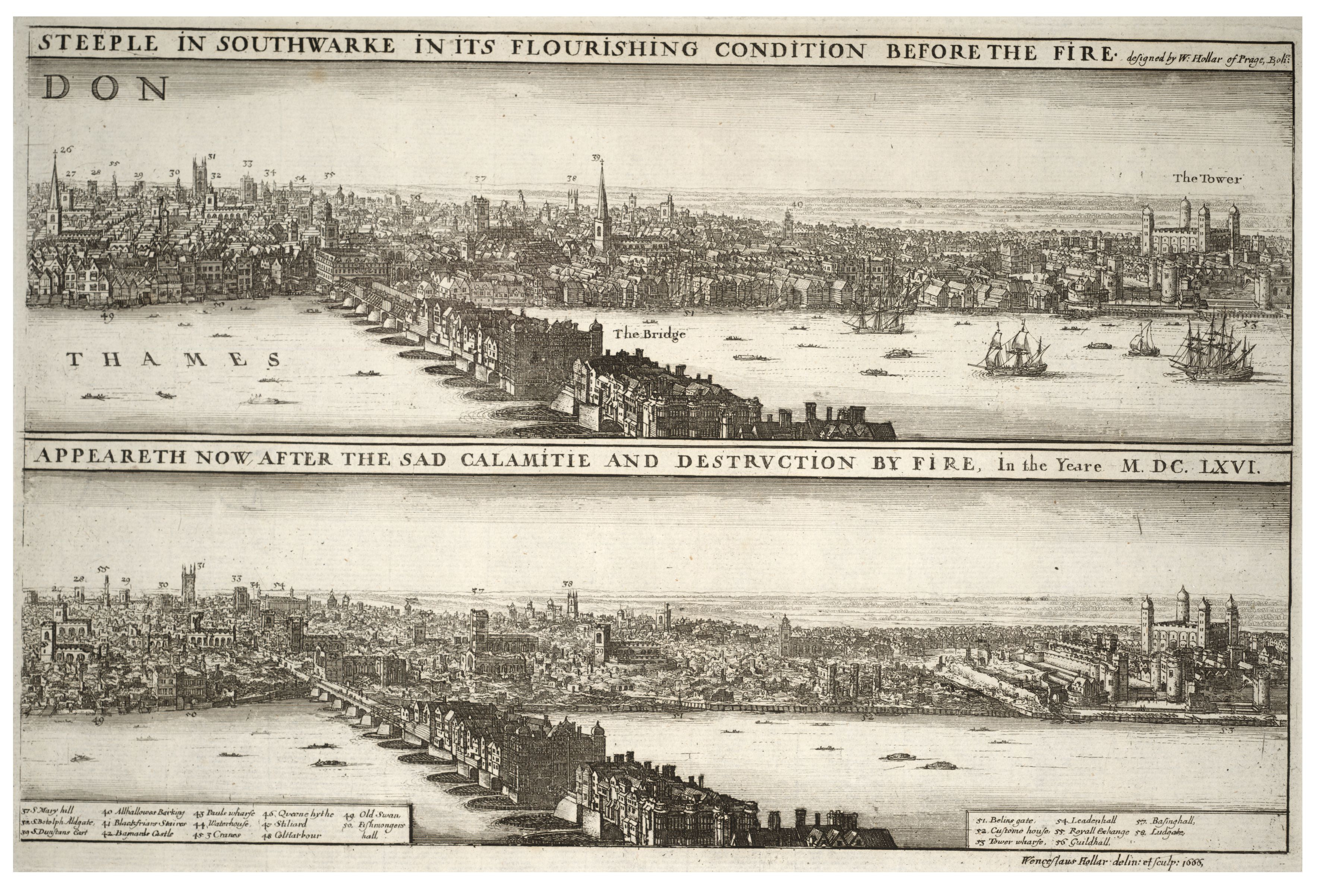
These two images (when joined) show a panorama of London before (top) and after (bottom) the fire

Many modern panoramic photographs of London exist, from many different viewpoints:

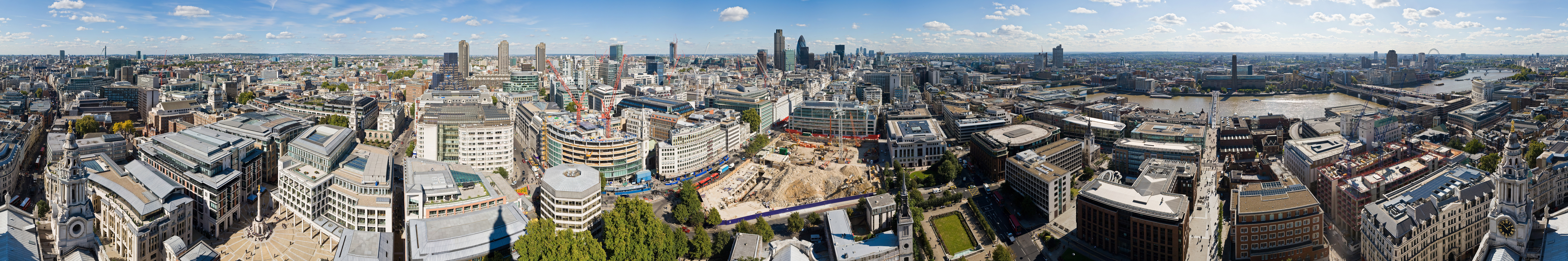
Panorama of modern London, taken from the Golden Gallery of St Paul's Cathedral, 2007
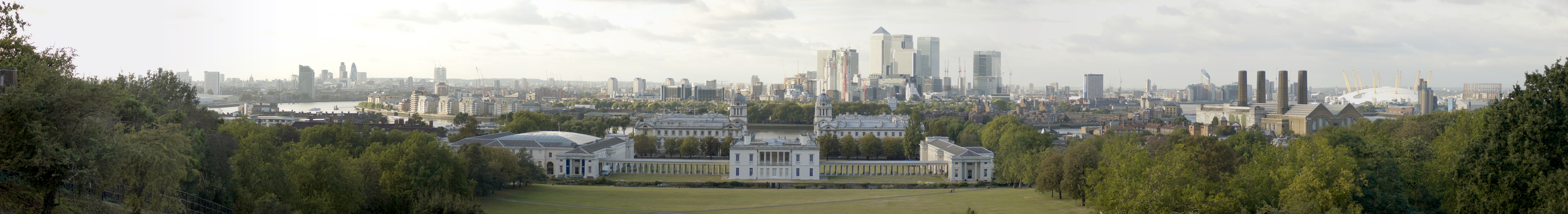
Panorama of London taken from Greenwich Park, 2007
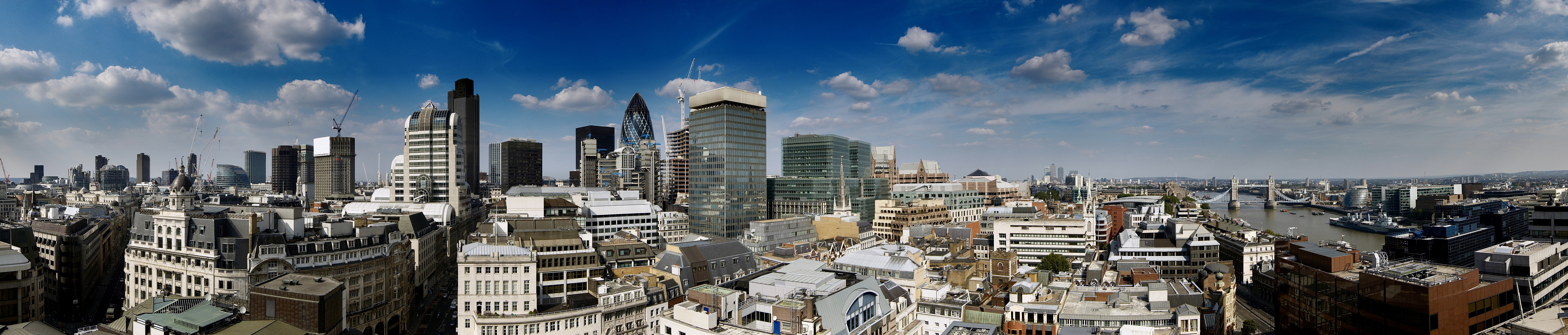
Panorama of London taken from the top of the Monument, 2006
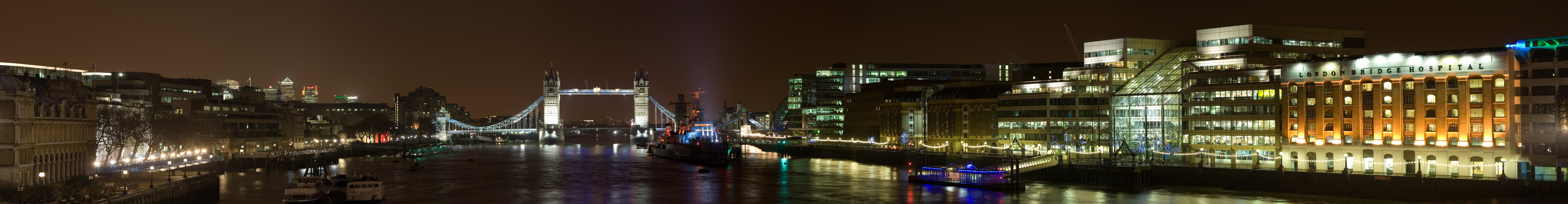
Panorama of London at night facing Tower Bridge, 2007
