= Visscher panorama =

c. 1600 engraving of London

The Visscher panorama is an engraving by Claes Visscher (1586-1652) depicting a panorama of London. It shows an imagined view of London in around 1600. The engraving was first published in Amsterdam in 1616, with the title "Londinum Florentissima Britanniae Urbs Toto Orbe Celeberrimum Emporiumque".

== Overview ==
The engraving comprises four separate plates creating a continuous panorama over 2 metres (6.6 ft) long. It provides one of the best views of London before the Great Fire in 1666. From a viewpoint on the south bank of the River Thames, it shows (from west to east, left to right) mansions on the north bank of the river: Whitehall Palace, York House, Durham House, old Somerset House, Burley House, Arundel House and Essex House, then Old St Paul's Cathedral without the spire which was lost after it was struck by lightning in 1561, the low-rise medieval City of London dominated by the spires and steeples of its churches, Old London Bridge covered by shops and houses, and the Tower of London and St Katharine Docks, with distant views of Harrow on the Hill, windmills at Hampstead, and the spires of Hackney and Stepney. Prominent buildings depicted on the south bank are three theatres, The Swan, The Globe and the Beargarden, and the churches of St Mary Overie (rebuilt after a fire in 1212, later to become Southwark Cathedral), and St Olave's. There are many ships in the river. In the sky above the city, to the right of St Paul's, are angels holding a banderole with the title "London", to either side appear angels bearing trumpets decorated with the royal coat of arms and the arms of the City of London and then in the upper corners cartouches framed with cherubs.

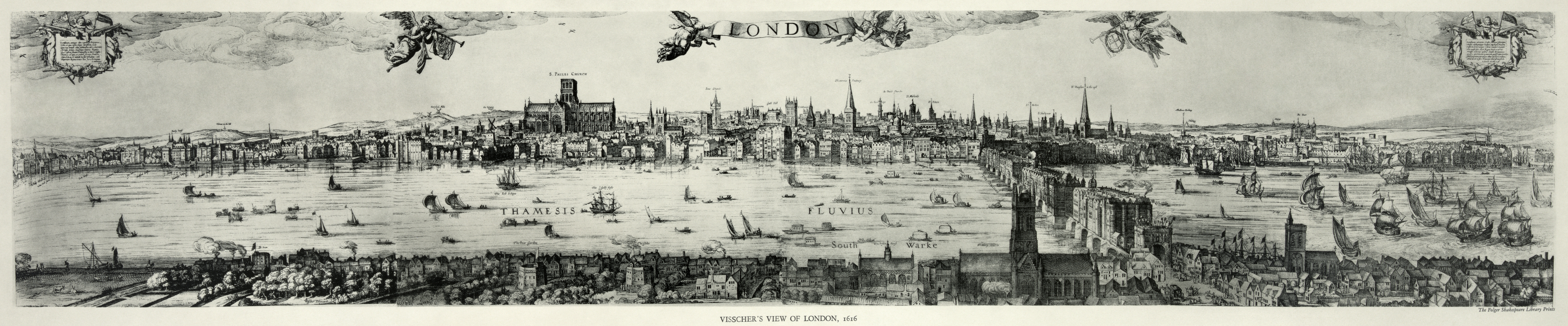
A panorama of London by Claes Visscher, 1616. Old St Paul's Cathedral had lost its spire by this time. The two theatres in the foreground on the Southwark side of the River Thames are The Bear Garden and The Globe. The large church in the foreground is St Mary Overie, now Southwark Cathedral.

Visscher probably never visited London. There are various theories as to how the image was compiled. One is that he worked from a combination of maps and map-views with a various dates, so the engraving uses a variety of viewpoints. As a result, it contains some inaccuracies: in particular, Visscher shows the Globe Theatre as octagonal, whereas archaeological evidence shows it was 20-sided, and the river is straightened to simplify the view. The engraving may be based on John Norden's Civitas Londini from around 1600, printed around 1615, the only complete surviving copy of which is in the Gardie Collection at the Royal Library in Stockholm, now held by the Nationalmuseum. Another is that he himself had no part in composing the view, and instead worked from sketches that were compiled several years before they passed into his hands. One possibility is that they were the work of his publisher, Jodocus Hondius, who spent several years in London. It's equally possible that they were the work of Hondius's brother-in-law, Pieter van den Keere, who also lived and worked in London, and who in the same year (1616) produced a panorama of Istanbul (then known as Constantinople) in precisely the same style - that is to say, under a heavy headline, and accompanied by tracts of Latin text arranged in 16 columns. Moreover there further is evidence, in the engraving styles, to suggest that Visscher and Van den Keere collaborated, since the same hand is, in places, at work in both the London and Istanbul panoramas.

A similar engraving of London by Wenceslas Hollar in 1647 depicts a similar view, on six plates, Long View of London from Bankside, based on drawings done by Hollar in London in the early 1640s, from the tower of St Mary Overie. Hollar's panorama has a single viewpoint, and shows the River Thames curving sinuously from left to right past the viewpoint.

The Royal Great Seal used from 1663 to 1672 shows Charles II on horseback, with a panorama of London behind, based on Visscher's print.

In 2014 Zimbabwe-born artist Robin Reynolds set out to redraw the Visscher panorama, arranging modern London on the quirky Visscher landscape. The work was displayed at the Guildhall Art Gallery as part of the City of London's Shakespeare400 and Great Fire anniversary celebrations.
