= The Entertainment at Britain's Burse =

Play

The Entertainment at Britain's Burse is a masque (kind of play) written by Ben Jonson in 1609 and rediscovered in 1997. It was commissioned by Robert Cecil, 1st Earl of Salisbury, in celebration of the opening of the "New Exchange" (essentially a shopping mall), on 11 April 1609.

The Venetian ambassador Marc' Antonio Correr described the new building and the entertainment. The text of the masque was discovered by James Knowles and published in 1997. It is an unusual Jonson text because it seems to be in celebration of consumer culture while so many of his other plays and poems condemn it—though there might be some satire intended. There are essentially only three characters. Each character performs a rather lengthy monologue including two songs by the final actor.

The masque begins with "The Key Keeper" who welcomes a "Maiestie" and "roiall lady", King James and the queen, Anne of Denmark, to the New Exchange. The Key Keeper describes the exchange like a "newe region", a place still foreign to himself containing many unexplored wonders. Then a "Shop Boy" describes all the many things for sell beginning and ending his speech asking "what doe you lacke?" Then "The Master", the owner of the shop, picks up where the shop-boy left off. He describes the many "mysterious" commodities and his adventures acquiring them. The play concludes with the master desiring wealth, saying, "And god make me Rich, which is the sellers prayer."

The Earl of Salisbury provided gifts for the royal family. Anne of Denmark was presented with a silver plaque, James had a cabinet, Prince Henry received a caparison for a horse, and courtiers were given rings.
