= Nicolaes Visscher II =

Dutch engraver, cartographer, publisher (1649–1702)

Nicolaes Visscher II (1649 – 1702) was a Dutch engraver, cartographer and publisher. He was the son of Nicolaes Visscher I and the grandson of Claes Janszoon Visscher. After his death, his wife, Elisabeth, continued the family tradition of mapmaking and publishing. The works, engraved plates, were then sold to Peter Schenk, who also reprinted them.

== Career ==
Nicolaes Visscher II was born into a family of mapmakers and publishers, including father Nicolaes Visscher I and grandfather Claes Janszoon Visscher.

Visscher took over the Amsterdam firm after his father’s death in 1679. He continued the business as both a cartographer and publisher, issuing maps and atlases from inherited plates as well as new material produced in the workshop.

Under his direction, the firm produced composite atlases whose contents could vary between copies. These were revised and reissued over time and included a combination of the family’s own engravings and maps obtained from other sources.

In 1682, at about thirty years of age, Visscher obtained a publishing privilege from the States of Holland and West Friesland, granting him exclusive rights to print and sell certain maps and atlases and preventing unauthorized copying.

Visscher produced regional and continental maps as well as maps for inclusion in atlases, maintaining the firm’s presence in the Amsterdam map trade of the late 17th century.

== Death and legacy ==
He remained active in the business until his death in 1702, in his early fifties. After his death, his wife, Elisabeth, continued the family tradition of mapmaking and publishing. The works, engraved plates, were then sold to Peter Schenk, who also reprinted them.

== Works ==
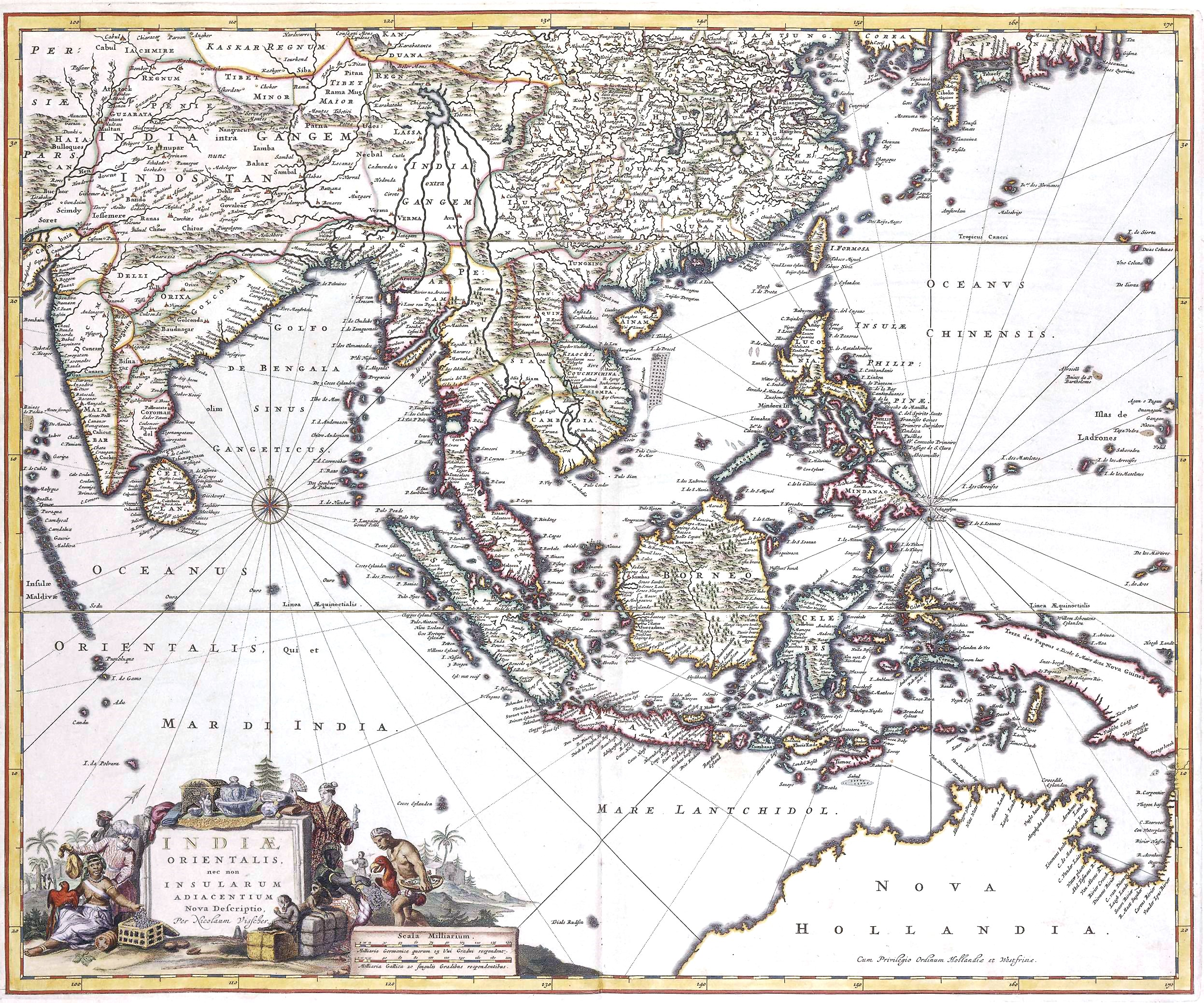
Indiae orientalis, nec non insularum adiacentium nova descriptio

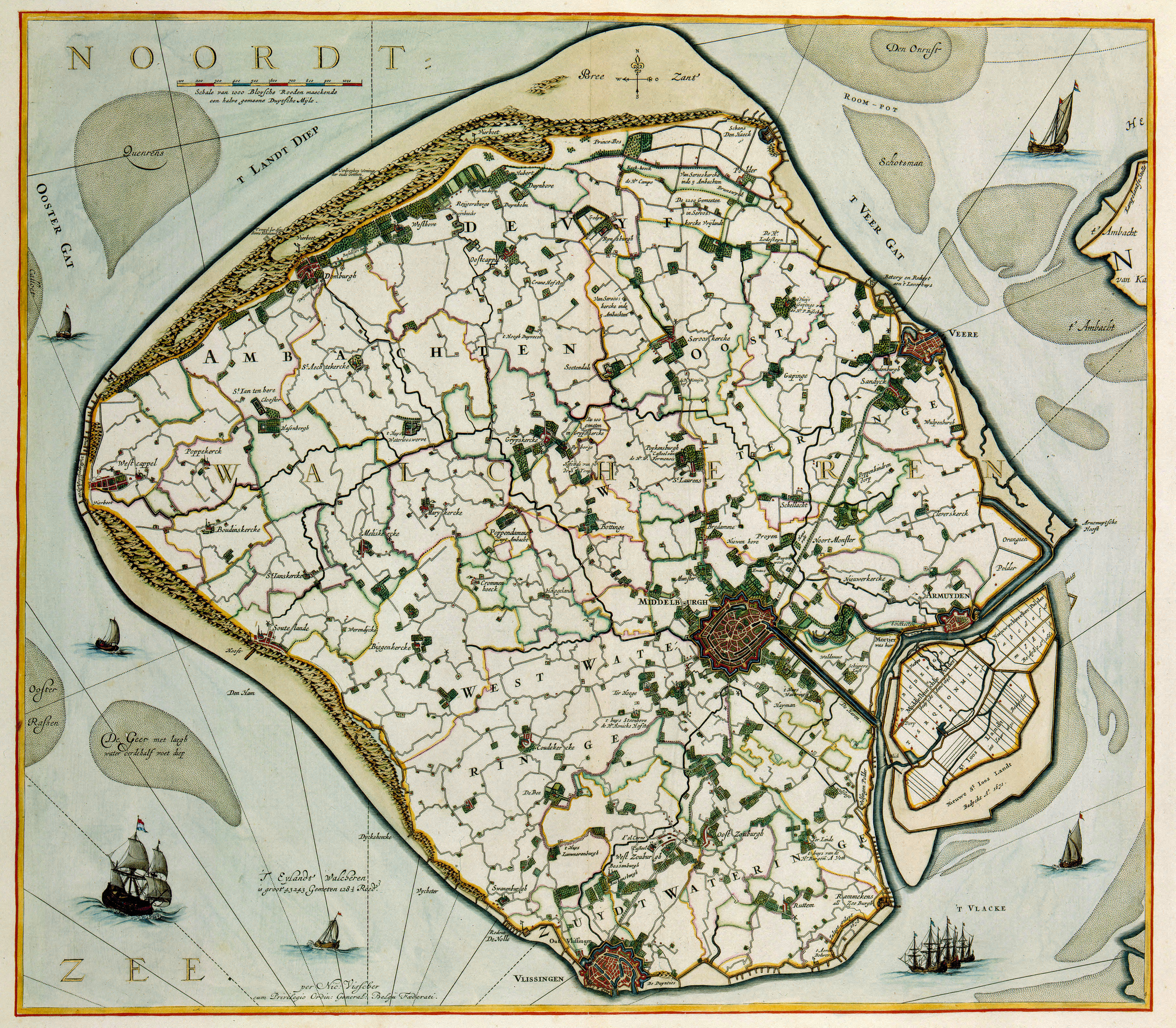
T Eylandt Walcheren

Exacta Totius Americae Tabula

Exacta Totius Asiae Tabula

Exacta Totius Europae Tabula
