= Claes Jansz. Visscher =

Dutch mapmaker (1587–1652)

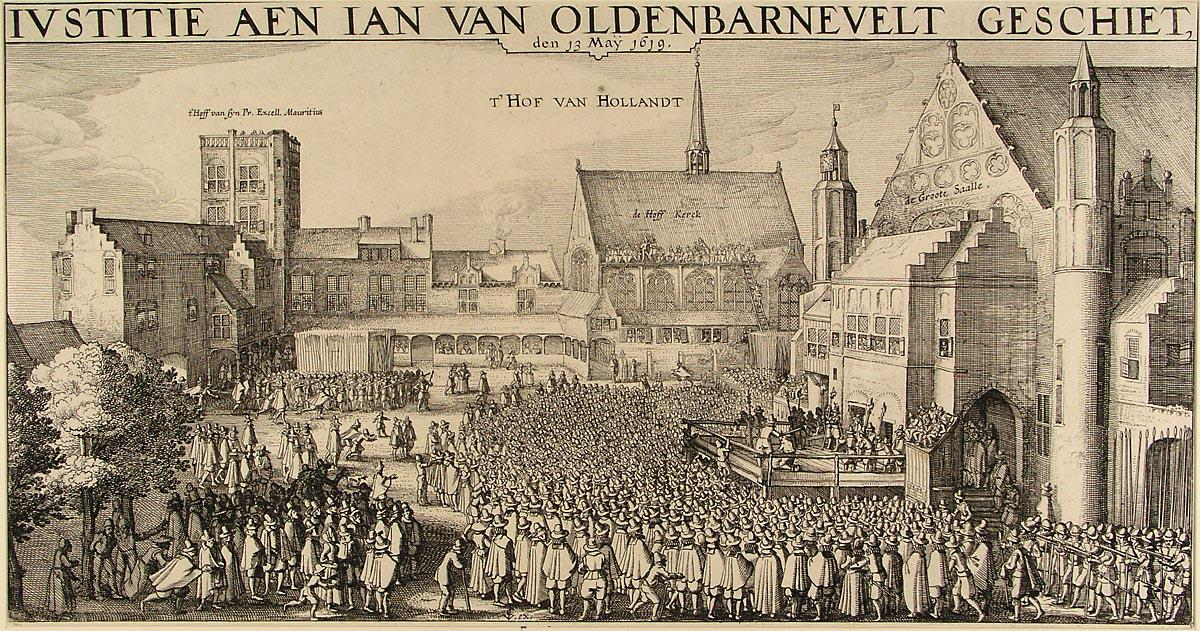
Claes Jansz. Visscher, Illustration of the decapitation of Johan van Oldenbarnevelt, Museum Boijmans Van Beuningen, 1619

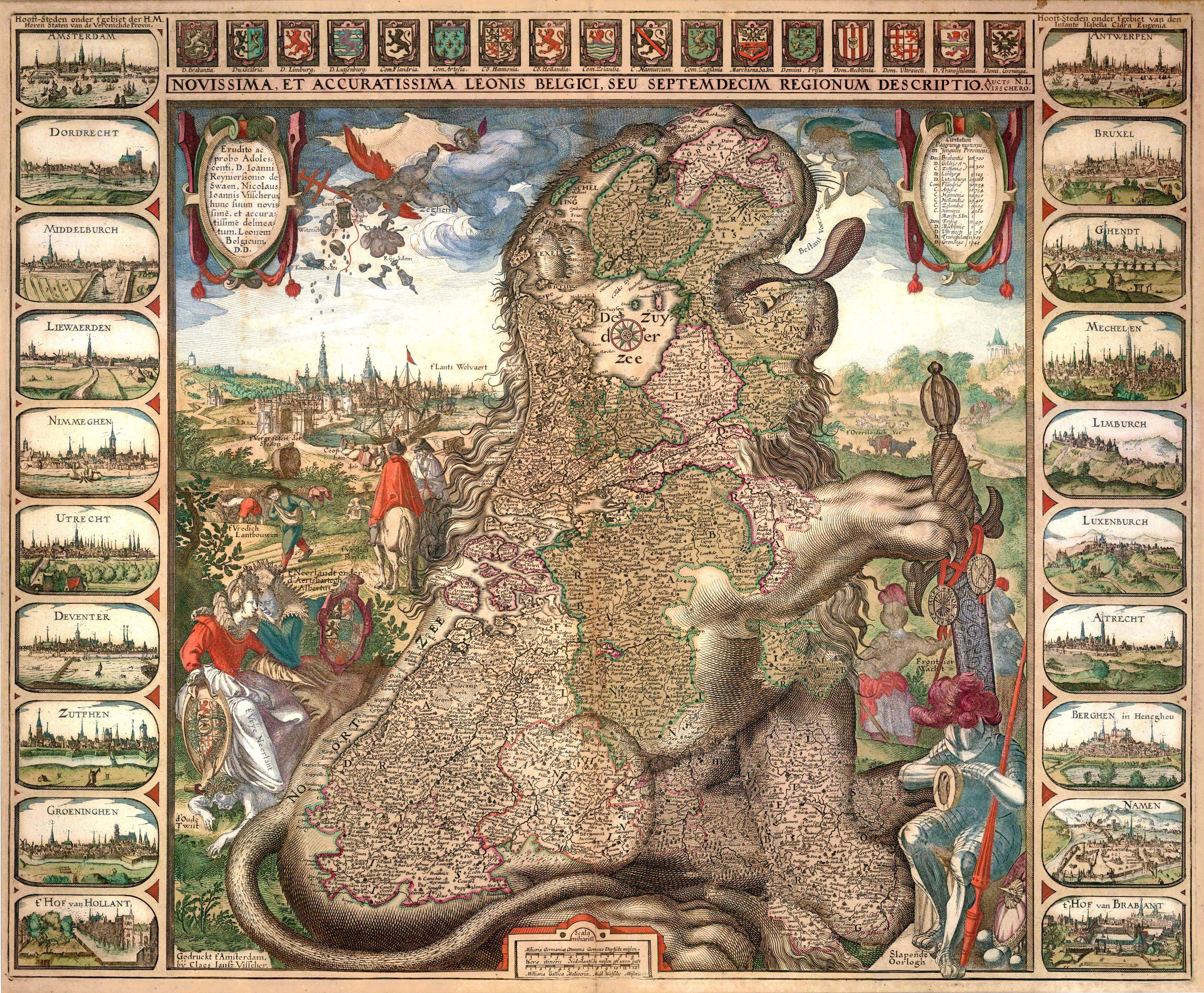
Claes Jansz. Visscher, Leo Belgicus, 1611

Claes Janszoon Visscher (1587 – 19 June 1652) was a Dutch Golden Age draughtsman, engraver, mapmaker, and publisher. He was the founder of the successful Visscher family mapmaking business. The firm that he established in Amsterdam would be passed down his generations until it was sold to Peter Schenk.

== Early life and family ==
Claes Janszoon Visscher was born in 1587 in Amsterdam, where he lived throughout his life. He was the son of Claes Jansz. Visscher I (c. 1550–1612), who taught him etching and printing. He was also known by the Latinized names Nicolas Joannes Piscator and Nicolas Joannis Visscher.

He first established his company in Amsterdam within a district known for publishing maps; the area saw fellow contemporary mapmakers such as Jodocus Hondius and Pieter van den Keere. There is also a belief that Hondius might have apprenticed Visscher.

Mapmaking and publishing became a family occupation. His son, Nicolaes Visscher I (1618–1679), and his grandson, Nicolaes Visscher II (1649–1702), also became mapmakers on the Kalverstraat in Amsterdam. The business he established remained in the family for several generations until it was sold to Peter Schenk.

== Biography ==
The times were with the Visschers for other reasons; due to the Protestant reformation, the older Bibles with their "Roman Catholic" illustrations were seen as outdated and apocryphal, but to liven up the new Protestant Bibles for the less well-read clergy, the Visschers produced illustrated maps and even landscapes of the places in the Bible. This became a very successful family business, with collaboration with many respected draughtsmen of the day. A new translation of the Bible was underway in the Netherlands, and until then, the new German translation done by Johannes Piscator, published in 1602–1604, was translated into Dutch. Though probably not a relative, his Bible translation was accepted by the Dutch Staten-General in 1602, which only lent more publicity and authenticity to the "Fisher" name.

The trademark of the Visschers was a fisherman, as he often published under the name Piscator. In his maps, a small fisherman would be strategically placed somewhere near water. If the subject was a landscape without a stream or pond, then often a figure walking with a fishing rod can be seen. Their map plates were reused for a century by other printers who unknowingly copied the entire plates, including the tell-tale fishermen. Observant scholars are thus able to trace the provenance of Bibles, maps, and landscapes from these signs.

Aside from Bibles, Claes Visscher II primarily etched and published landscapes, portraits, and maps. He etched over 200 plates and his maps included elaborate original borders. He was a publisher of prints by Esaias van de Velde, and David Vinckboons, and was a big influence on Roelant Roghman and on his sister Geertruyd.

== Death ==
Visscher died in 1652 at the age of 64.

== Gallery ==
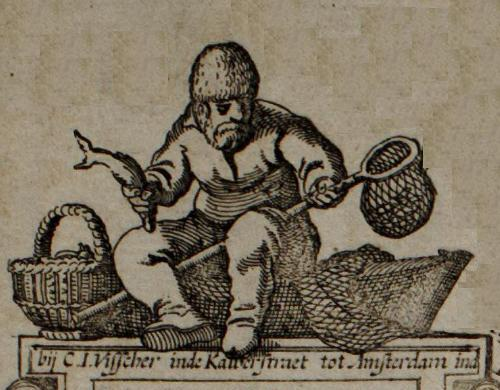
Detail of a map from 1630 with the "Fisher logo". The signature is both the fisherman drawing and the text "by C.J.Visscher in the Kalverstraet in Amsterdam.

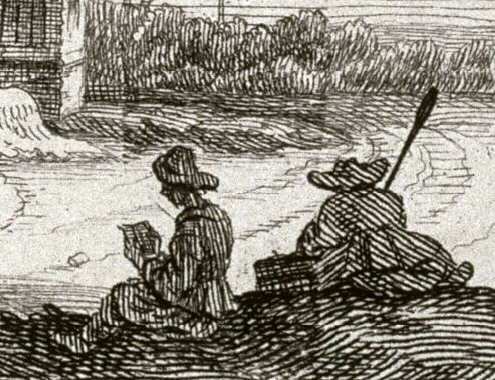
Fisher added to print of drawing by Geertruydt Roghman.

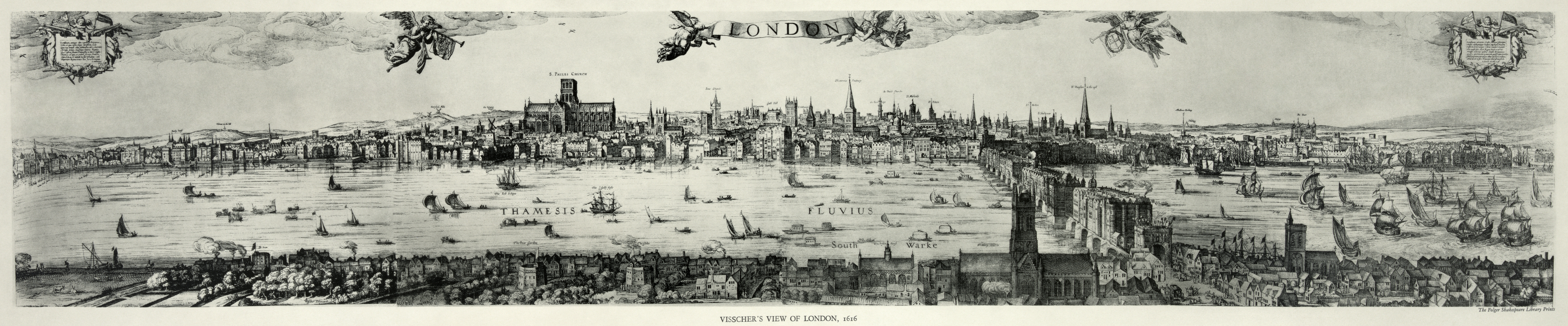
Visscher panorama, panorama of London, 1616

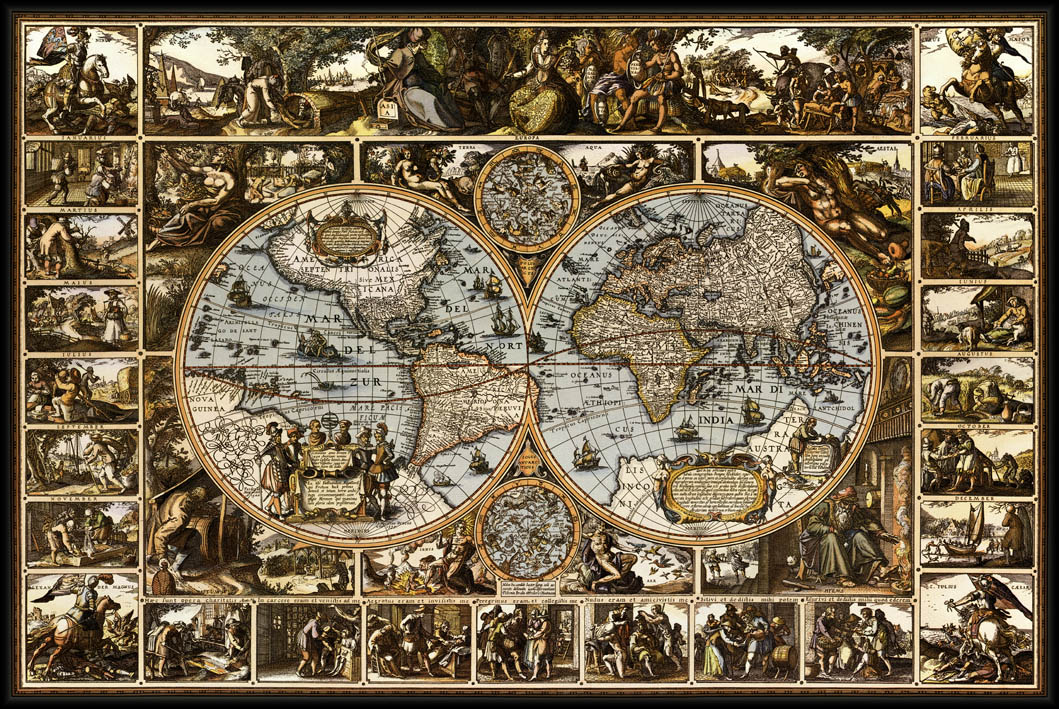
A 1617 untitled double hemisphere world map created by Claes Jansz Visscher

1618 map of Paris by Claes Janszoon Visscher

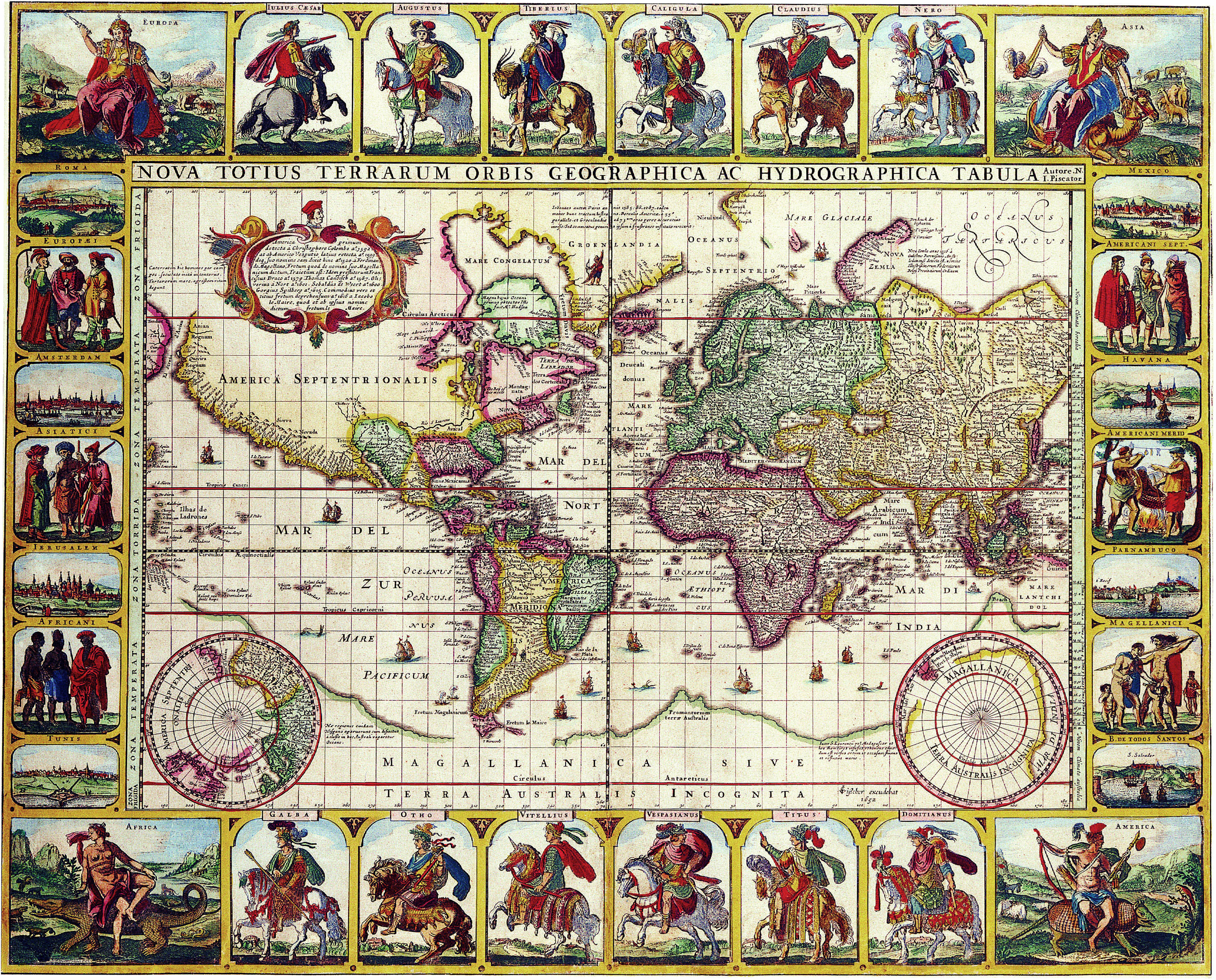
1652 world map by Claes Janszoon Visscher
