= Nicolaes Visscher I =

Dutch engraver, cartographer and publisher

Nicolaes Visscher I (25 January 1618 – buried 11 September 1679) was a Dutch engraver, cartographer and publisher. He was the son of Claes Janszoon Visscher.

== Death and legacy ==
His son, Nicolaes Visscher II (1649–1702), also worked with him and continued the family tradition of mapmaking after his death. Visscher died in Amsterdam in 1679 and was buried in the Nieuwezijds Kapel on 11 September of that year, though a death year of 1709 is maintained by some sources.

== Works ==
His engraved double hemisphere map, Orbis Terrarum Nova et Accuratissima Tabula, was created in 1658 in Amsterdam. It also contains smaller northern and southern polar projections. The border is decorated with mythological scenes, one in each corner, drawn by the painter Nicolaes Berchem, showing Zeus, Neptune, Persephone and Demeter. It is an early example of highly decorated Dutch world maps.

== Gallery ==
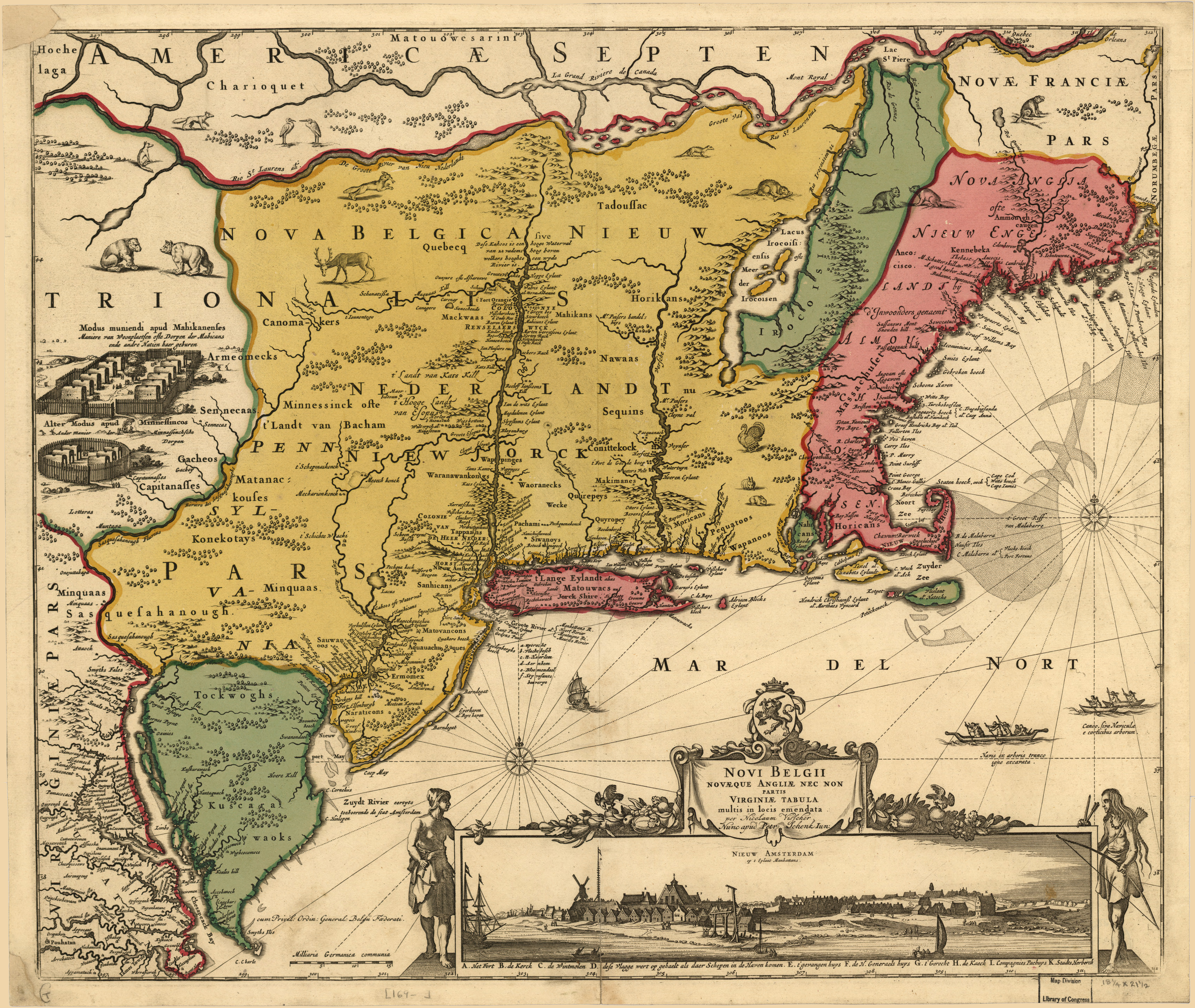
1685 interpretation of Visscher’s 1656 Novi Belgii Novæque Angliæ nec non partis Virginiæ tabula by Petrus Schenk Junior

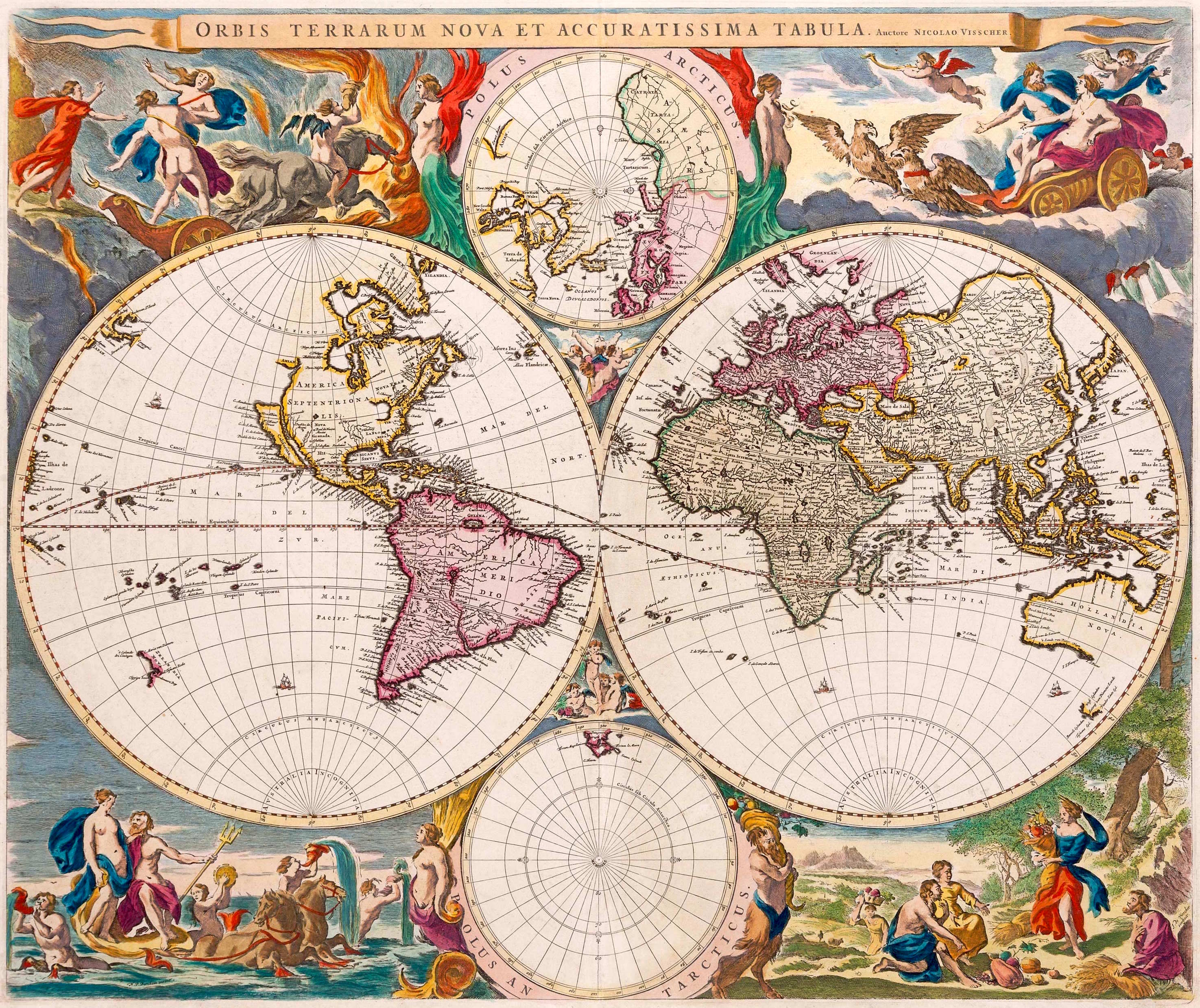
Orbis Terrarum Nova et Accuratissima Tabula (1658)

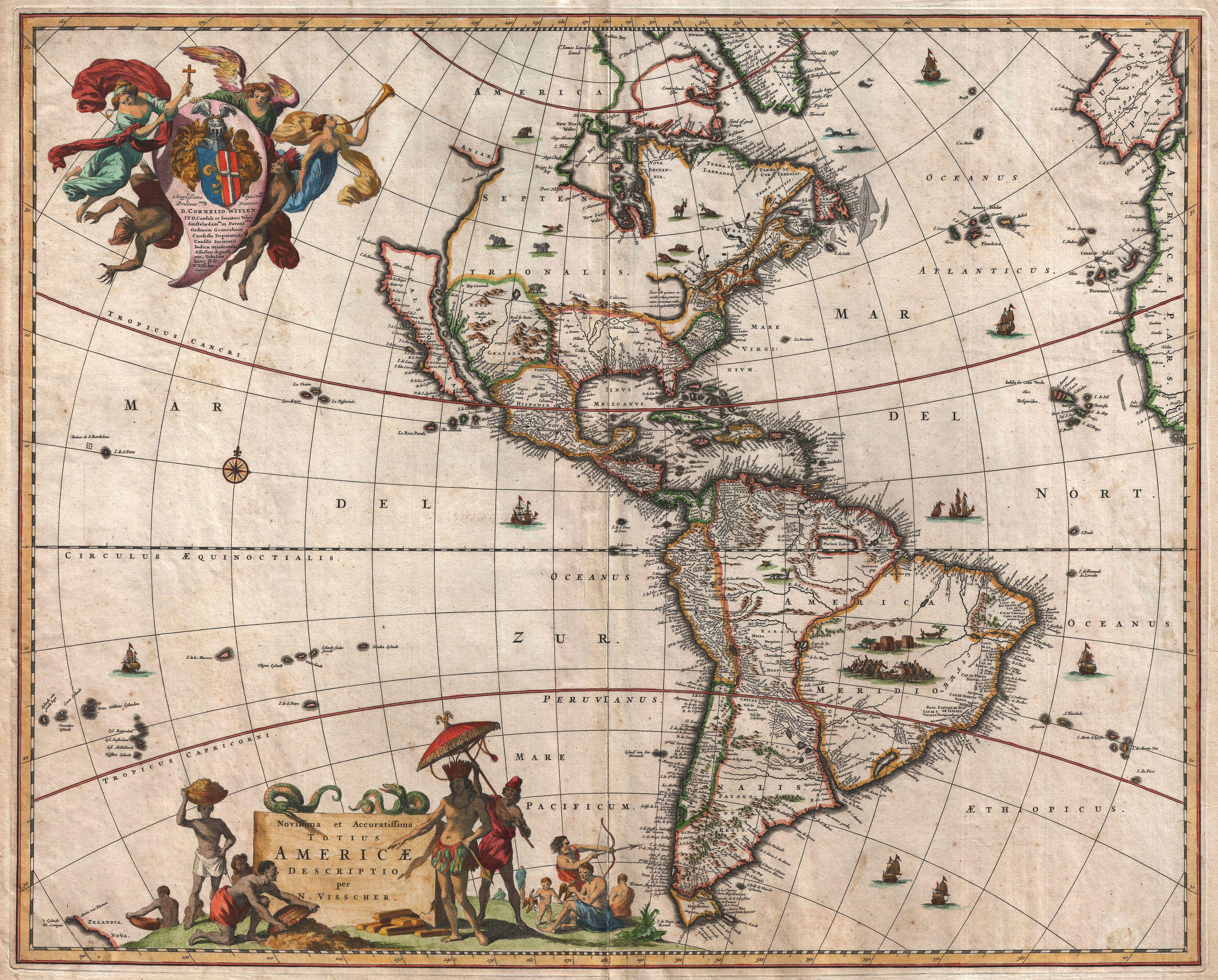
Novissima et Accuratissima Totius Americae Descriptio (1658)

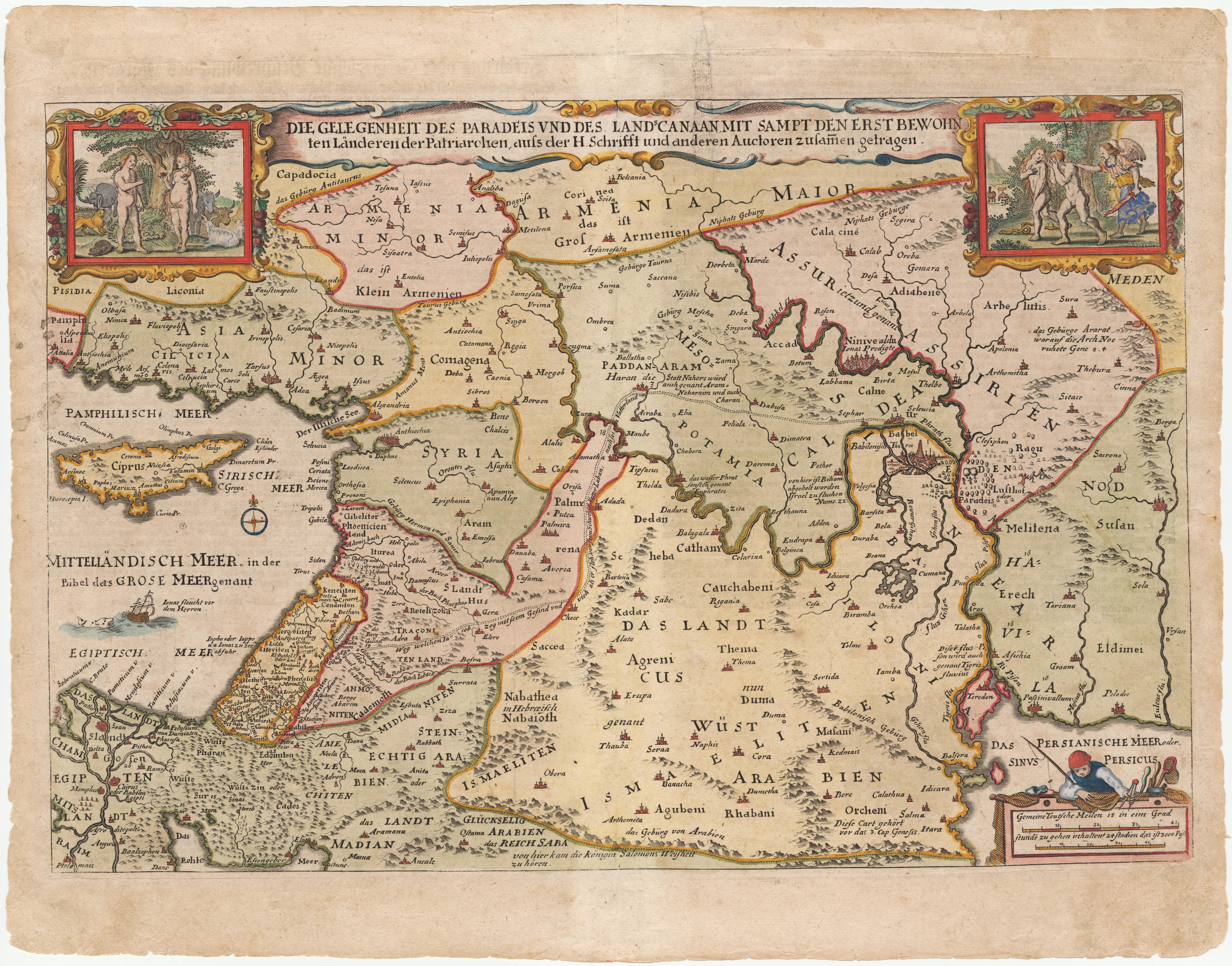
Die Gelegenheit Des Paradeis Und Des Lands Canaan Mit Sampt Den Erst Bewohnten Landeren Der Partriarchen Auss Der H. Schrifft Und Anderen Auctoren Zusamen Getragen (1665)
