= Britain's Bourse =

Former shopping arcade in London, England

Coordinates: 51°30′34.57″N 0°7′22.55″W

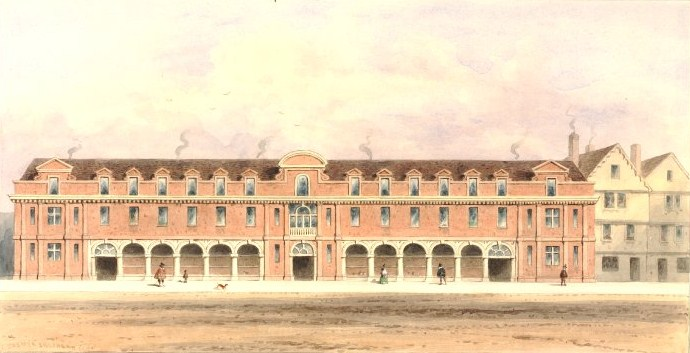
Watercolour from the 19th century by Thomas Hosmer Shepherd, after an old drawing.

Britain's Bourse, also known as the New Exchange, was a shopping arcade located on the Strand, London opened by James I in 1609. It was demolished in 1737.

== History ==
Inigo Jones submitted a design, but these were not used. It was built by Sir Robert Cecil, 1st Earl of Salisbury. Building commenced on 10 June 1608. The site had previously been occupied by the stables of Durham House, now 52 to 64 Strand. Salisbury faced some opposition from shopkeepers who petitioned the Lord Mayor, and in July 1608 he drafted a response comparing complaints about his "handsome range" to objections that could have been raised in 1570 about the founding of Sir Thomas Gresham's Exchange.

The building was briefly known as the Salisbury Exchange, but was renamed when James I opened the building on 11 April 1609. He was accompanied by his queen, Anne of Denmark, his son, later Charles I of England and daughter Elizabeth, later Queen of Bohemia. The opening included a theatrical production by Ben Jonson, The Entertainment at Britain's Burse.

The Venetian ambassador Marc' Antonio Correr described the new building as "two great galleries" with shops on either side. It primarily catered for women providing not only fashionable clothes and millinery, but also ornaments and items of furniture. However it also included several bookshops. Along with the Royal Exchange it provided one of the major shopping centres in London, particularly after the Fire of London.

Cosimo III de' Medici, Grand Duke of Tuscany visited the premises during his visit to England in 1669 and described the building:

"The building has a facade of stone, built after the Gothic style, which has lost its colour from age and become blackish. It contains two long and double galleries, one above the other, in which are distributed in several rows great numbers of very rich shops of drapers and mercers filled with goods of every kind, and with manufactures of the most beautiful description. These are for the most part under the care of well-dressed women, who are busily employed in work, although many are served by young men called apprentices."
