= Globe Theatre =

16th/17th-century theatre in London

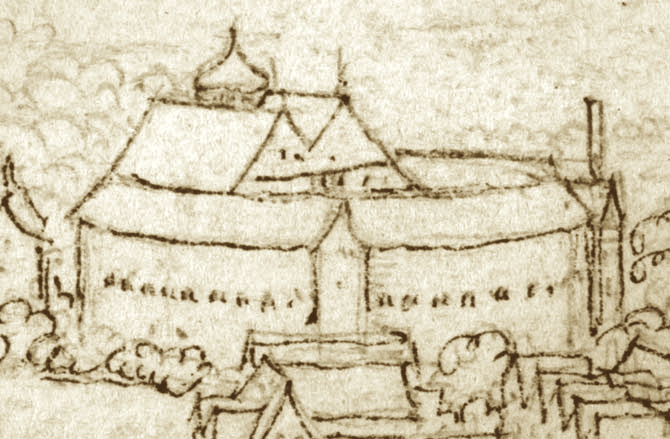
- The second Globe, preliminary sketch (c. 1638) for Hollar's 1647 Long View of London
- Interactive map of Globe Theatre
- Address: Maiden Lane (now Park Street) Southwark; London; England
- Coordinates: 51°30′24″N 00°5′41″W
- Owner: Lord Chamberlain's Men
- Type: Elizabethan theatre

Construction
- Opened: 1599
- Closed: 1642
- Demolished: 1644–45
- Rebuilt: 1614

The Globe Theatre was a theatre in London associated with William Shakespeare. It was built in 1599 at Southwark, close to the south bank of the Thames, by Shakespeare's playing company, the Lord Chamberlain's Men. It was destroyed by fire on 29 June 1613. A second Globe Theatre was built on the same site by June 1614 and stayed open until the London theatre closures of 1642. As well as plays by Shakespeare, early works by Ben Jonson, Thomas Dekker and John Fletcher were first performed here.

A modern reconstruction of the Globe, named "Shakespeare's Globe", opened in 1997 approximately 750 feet (230 m) from the site of the original theatre.

== Location ==
Examination of old leases and parish records has identified the plot of land acquired for building The Globe as extending from the west side of modern-day Southwark Bridge Road eastwards as far as Porter Street and from Park Street southwards as far as the back of Gatehouse Square. Conveniently within the "entertainment ghetto" already established at Southwark, it was being offered for rent by Thomas Brend, who was a neighbour to John Heminges and Henry Condell, actors with the Chamberlain's Men.

The precise location of the building remained unknown until a small part of the foundations, including one original pier base, was discovered in 1989 by the Department of Greater London Archaeology (now Museum of London Archaeology) beneath the car park at the rear of Anchor Terrace on Park Street. The shape of the foundations is now replicated on the surface. As the majority of the foundations lies beneath 67–70 Anchor Terrace, a listed building, no further excavations have been permitted.

== History ==
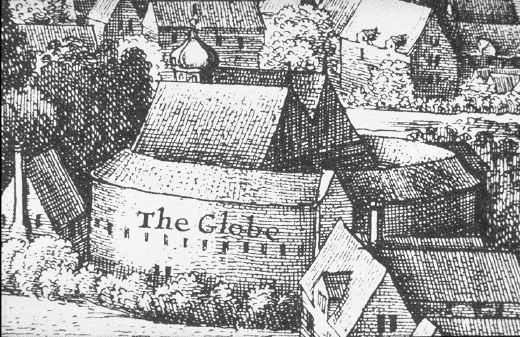
Second Globe Theatre, detail from Hollar's View of London, 1647 (Note: Hollar sketched the building from life (see top), but only later assembled the drawings into this View, when he mislabelled his images of The Globe and the nearby Bear Garden. Here the correct label has been restored. Tim Fitzpatrick, professor of performance studies at Sydney University, describes how the onion dome (centre) could have covered a roof lantern to admit extra daylight to the inner stage. The small building to the left supplied food- and ale-sellers at the theatre.)

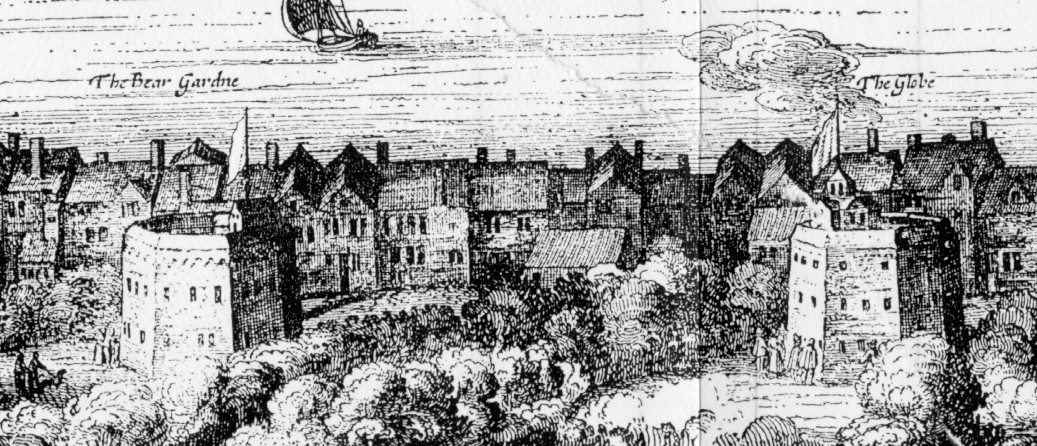
Detail from the Visscher panorama of 1616 showing The Globe (right) and the Bear Garden (left)

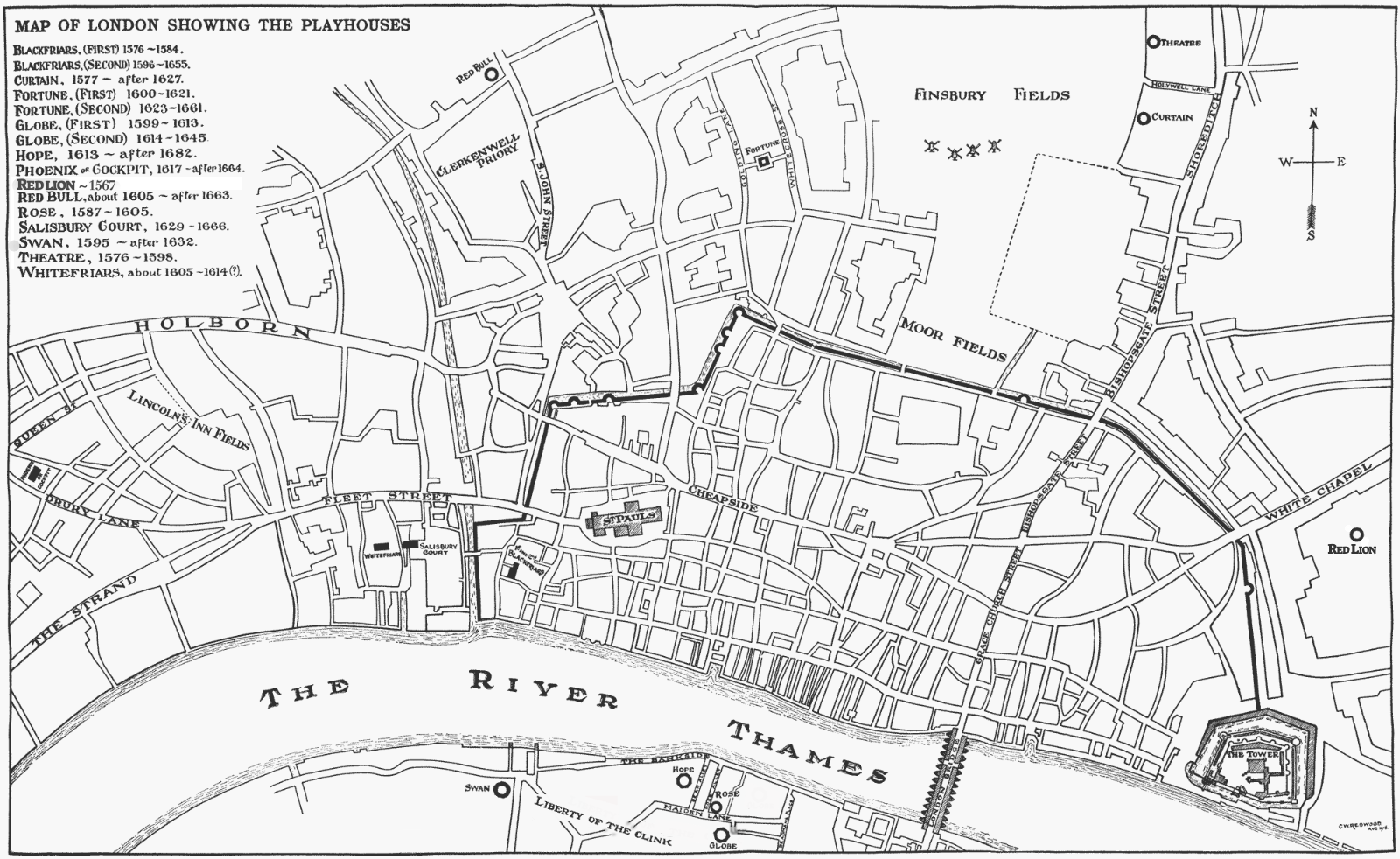
The Globe Theatre is shown at the bottom centre of this London street map.

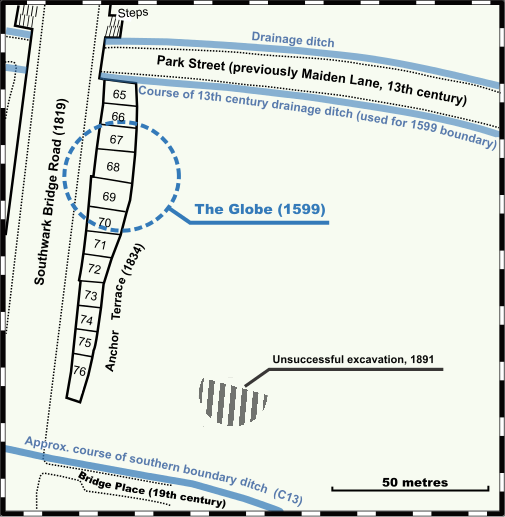
Position on modern street plan

The Globe was owned by actors who were also shareholders in the Lord Chamberlain's Men. Two of the six Globe shareholders, Richard Burbage and his brother Cuthbert Burbage, owned double shares of the whole, or 25 per cent each; the other four men, Shakespeare, John Heminges, Augustine Phillips, and Thomas Pope, owned a single share, or 12.5 per cent. (Originally William Kempe was intended to be the seventh partner, but he sold out his share to the four minority sharers, leaving them with more than the originally planned 10 per cent). These initial proportions changed over time as new sharers were added. Shakespeare's share diminished from 1/8 to 1/14 (roughly 7 per cent), over the course of his career.

The Globe was built in 1599 using timber from an earlier theatre, The Theatre, which had been built by Richard Burbage's father, James Burbage, in Shoreditch in 1576. The Burbages originally had a 21-year lease of the site on which the theatre was built but owned the building outright. However, the landlord, Giles Allen, claimed that the building had become his with the expiry of the lease. On 28 December 1598, while Allen was celebrating Christmas at his country home, carpenter Peter Street, supported by the players and their friends, dismantled The Theatre beam by beam and transported it to Street's waterfront warehouse near Bridewell. With the onset of more favourable weather in the following spring, the material was ferried over the Thames to reconstruct it as The Globe on some marshy gardens to the south of Maiden Lane, Southwark. While only a hundred yards from the congested shore of the Thames, the piece of land was situated close by an area of farmland and open fields. It was poorly drained and, notwithstanding its distance from the river, was liable to flooding at times of particularly high tide; a "wharf" (bank) of raised earth with timber revetments had to be created to carry the building above the flood level. The new theatre was larger than the building it replaced, with the older timbers being reused as part of the new structure; the Globe was not merely the old Theatre newly set up at Bankside. The cost was £700. It was probably completed by the summer of 1599, possibly in time for the opening production of Henry V and its famous reference to the performance crammed within a "wooden O". Dover Wilson, however, defers the opening date until September 1599, taking the "wooden O" reference to be disparaging and thus unlikely to be used in the Globe's inaugural staging. He suggests that the account of Thomas Platter, a Swiss tourist, describing a performance of Julius Caesar witnessed on 21 September 1599, tells of the more likely first production. The first performance for which a firm record remains was Jonson's Every Man out of His Humour—with its first scene welcoming the "gracious and kind spectators"—at the end of the year.

On 29 June 1613, the Globe Theatre went up in flames during a performance of Henry VIII. A theatrical cannon, set off during the performance, misfired, igniting the wooden beams and thatching. According to one of the few surviving documents of the event, no one was hurt except a man whose burning breeches were put out with a bottle of ale. It was rebuilt in the following year (with a tile roof) at a cost of £1,400.

Like all the other theatres in London, the Globe was closed down by the outbreak of the First English Civil War, when the Long Parliament closed all London theatres by an ordinance dated 2 September 1642. It was pulled down in 1644–45 (the commonly cited document dating the act to 15 April 1644 is not reliable) to make room for tenements.

A modern reconstruction of the theatre, named "Shakespeare's Globe", opened in 1997, with a production of Henry V. It is an academic approximation of the original design, based on available evidence of the 1599 and 1614 buildings, and is located approximately 750 feet (230 m) from the site of the original theatre.

== Layout ==
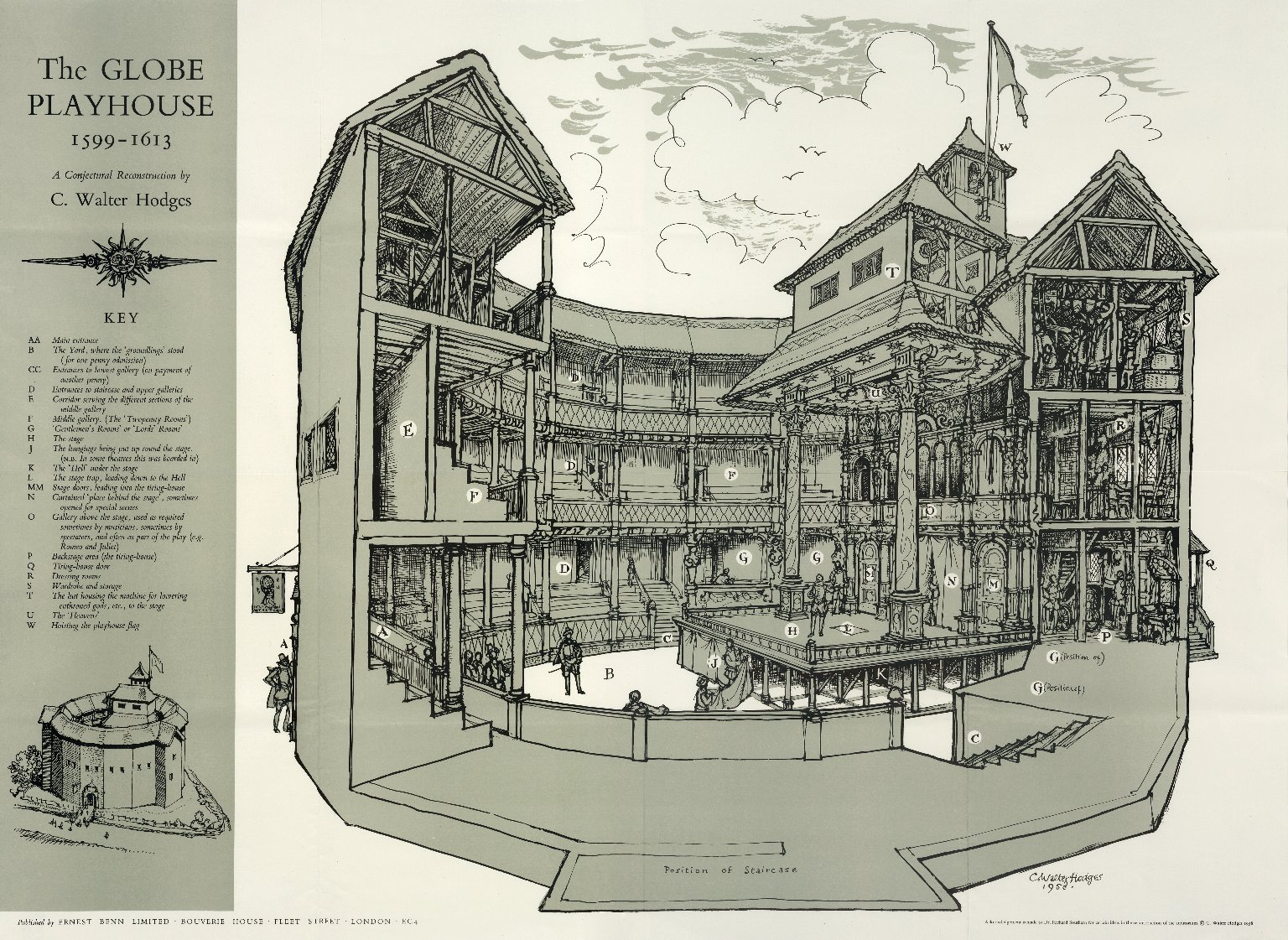
Conjectural reconstruction of the Globe theatre by C. Walter Hodges based on archaeological and documentary evidence

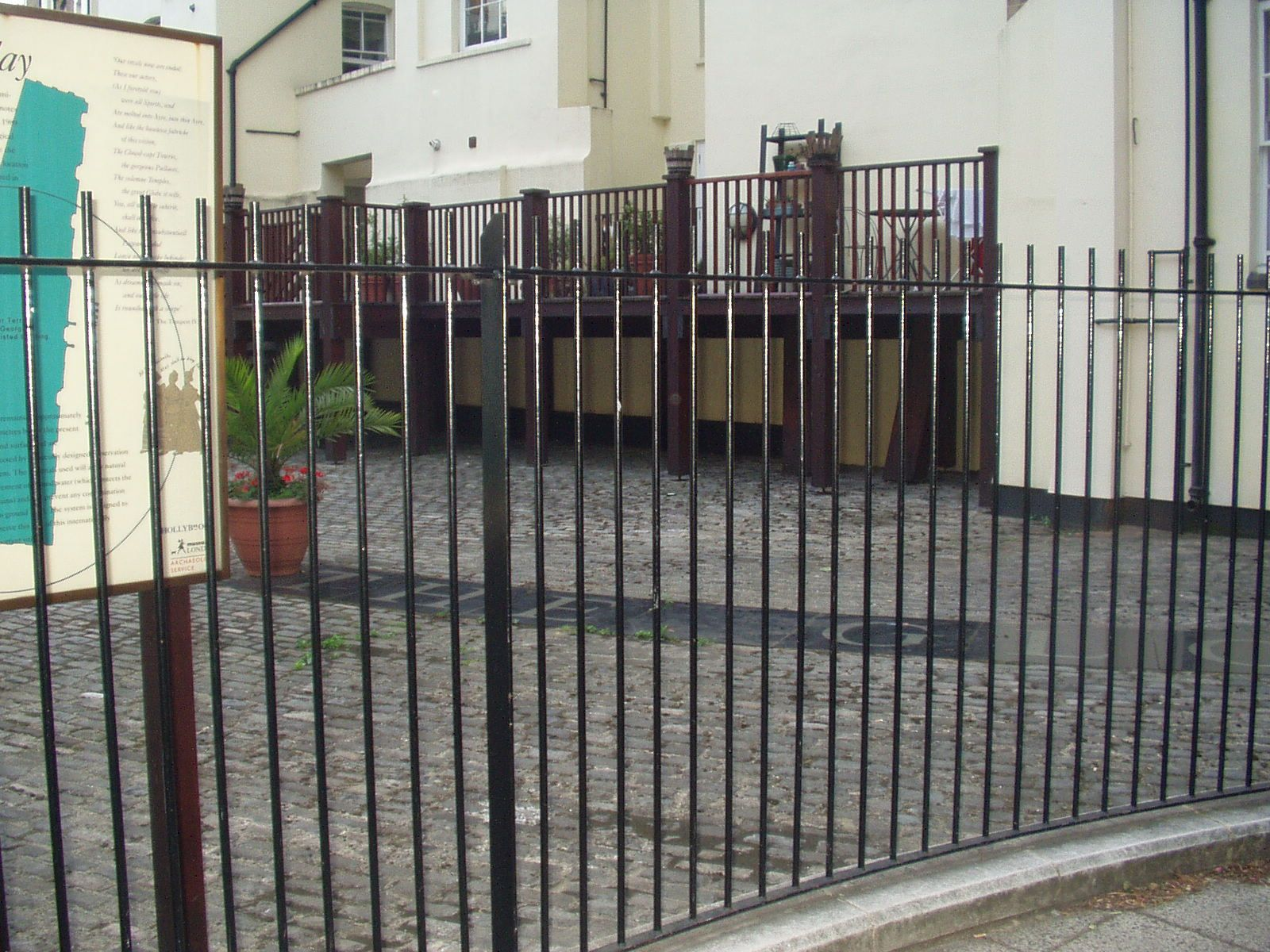
Site of the Globe Theatre, from Park Street; the dark line in the centre marks the foundation line. The white wall beyond is the rear of Anchor Terrace.

The Globe's detailed dimensions are unknown, but its shape and size can be estimated from scholarly inquiry over the last two centuries. The evidence suggests that it was a three-storey, open-air amphitheatre approximately 100 feet (30 m) in diameter that could house up to 3,000 spectators. The Globe is shown as round on Wenceslas Hollar's sketch of the building, later incorporated into his etched Long View of London from Bankside in 1647. However, in 1988–89 the uncovering of a small part of the Globe's foundation suggested that it was a polygon of 20 sides.

At the base of the stage and surrounding it on three sides, there was an area called the yard, the name deriving from the old inn-yards, where, for a penny, people (the "groundlings") would stand on the rush-strewn earthen floor to watch the performance. During the excavation of the Globe in 1989 a layer of nutshells was found, pressed into the dirt flooring so as to form a new surface layer. Vertically around the yard were three levels of more expensive stadium-style seats. A rectangular stage platform thrust out into the middle of the open-air yard. The stage was approximately 43 feet (13 m) in width, 27 feet (8 m) in depth and was raised about 5 feet (1.5 m) off the ground. On this stage, there was a trapdoor for use by performers to enter from the "cellarage" area beneath the stage.

The back wall of the stage had two or three doors on the main level, with a curtained inner stage in the centre (although not all scholars agree about the existence of this supposed "inner below"), and a balcony above it. The doors entered into the "tiring house" (backstage area) where the actors dressed and awaited their entrances. The floors above may have been used as storage for costumes and props, and management offices. The balcony housed the musicians, and could also be used for scenes requiring an upper space, such as the "balcony" scene in Romeo and Juliet. Rush matting covered the stage, although this may only have been used if the setting of the play demanded it.

Large columns on either side of the stage supported a roof over the rear portion of the stage. The ceiling under this roof was called the "heavens," and was painted as a sky with clouds. A trapdoor in the heavens enabled performers to descend using some form of rope and harness. The stage was set in the south-east corner of the building so as to be in shade during afternoon performances in summer.

== Name, motto and flag ==
The name of the Globe supposedly alludes to the Latin tag totus mundus agit histrionem ("all the world plays the player"), in turn derived from quod fere totus mundus exerceat histrionem—"because all the world is a playground"—from Petronius, the satirical Roman author who had wide circulation in England in the Burbages' time. Totus mundus agit histrionem was, according to this explanation, therefore adopted as the theatre's motto. It seems likely, however, that the link between the supposed motto from Petronius and the theatre was made only later, originating with the industrious early Shakespeare biographer William Oldys, who claimed as his source a loaned copy of the Harleian Manuscripts to which he once had access. This was repeated in good faith by his literary executor George Steevens, but the tale is now thought "suspicious", with Oldys perpetrating a "hoax on his credulous public". The Shakespearean editor Edmond Malone took Oldys's conjecture further, by reporting that the motto was on the theatre's flag of a globe of the Earth on the shoulders of Hercules.

Another allusion, familiar to the contemporary theatre-goer, would have been to Teatrum Mundi ("Theatre of the World"), a meditation by the twelfth-century philosopher John of Salisbury, in his Policraticus, book three. This included a discourse on theatrical metaphors from the Bible and from many authors from classical antiquity. Reprinted in 1595, it was in wide circulation and much read. Critic Ernst Curtius has described how it was John of Salisbury's commentary, rather than the works of Petronius, that suggested the name.

There would have been a ready understanding of the classical derivation. Shakespeare's complaint in Hamlet (act 2, scene 3) likening the child actors of the Blackfriars Theatre stealing the Globe's custom as "carrying off Hercules […] and his load too" alludes to the metaphor. An elegy on the death of Globe actor Richard Burbage alludes to the god Atlas on the theatre's flag, but in mythology the figures of Atlas and Hercules can be interchangeable, as one of the labours of Hercules was to relieve Atlas of his burden. G. B. Harrison, in his introduction to an edition of As You Like It (Penguin Books, 1953), perceives that Jaques is making reference to the Globe Theatre's motto in his "All the world's a stage" speech (act 2 scene 7).

== See also ==
- Curtain Theatre
- The Rose
- The Theatre
