= Durham House, London =

Historic London town house of the Bishop of Durham in the Strand

Durham House
- Durham Inn
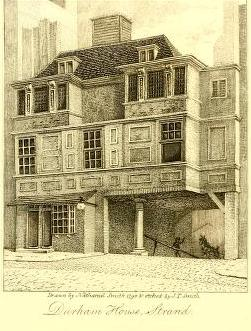
- Durham House, 1806 engraving by John Thomas Smith

- Location within City of Westminster
- 51.5099847°N 0.1226087°W
- Etymology: Bishop of Durham
- Location: Strand, Westminster, London

History
- Built: ≈1345
- Built for: Bishop Thomas Hatfield
- Original use: Bishop's palace
- Demolished: ≈1760

Site notes
- Architect: Anthony Bek
- Architectural style: Medieval
- Current use: Current location of the Adelphi Theatre

Durham House, also known as Durham Inn, was the historic town house of the Bishop of Durham in the Strand, City of Westminster. Its gardens descended to the River Thames.

== History ==
=== Origins ===
Bishop Thomas Hatfield built the opulent Durham House as a London residence in about 1345. It had a large chapel and a high-ceilinged great hall supported by marble pillars. On the Strand side its gatehouse led to a large courtyard. The hall and chapel faced the entrance, and private apartments overlooked the river.

Accounts describe Durham House as a noble palace befitting a prince. King Henry IV, his son Henry, Prince of Wales (later Henry V), and their retinues stayed once at the residence.

=== Tudor and Jacobean era ===
While Durham House remained an episcopal palace, Catherine of Aragon lived as a virtual prisoner there between her marriages to Arthur, Prince of Wales and King Henry VIII. Eventually, Bishop Cuthbert Tunstall relinquished it to King Henry VIII, who contracted to give the bishop in return Coldharbour in Dowgate Ward, London, and other residences but never honoured that promise. Henry FitzRoy, Duke of Richmond and Somerset, in his youth, resided in Durham House, having been granted it in 1525. Anne Boleyn lived in Durham House in 1532 while Henry courted her prior to their marriage in 1533. Henry granted Durham House to his daughter Lady Elizabeth (later queen) for life, or until she was otherwise advanced. Henry's son King Edward VI later confirmed the grant, and thereby deprived Tunstall of his palace. However, on her accession to the throne Queen Mary I removed the house from the possession of Lady Elizabeth and restored it to Tunstall, together with his see, as it had become apparent that Tunstall no longer had a London residence.

Mary's predecessor, Lady Jane Grey, the "Nine Days" Queen of England, was married at Durham House on May 21 or 25, 1553 to Guilford Dudley. On the same date and place, Guildford's sister Katherine married Henry Hastings, the Earl of Huntingdon's heir; and Jane's sister Katherine married Lord Herbert, the heir of the Earl of Pembroke.

Upon her accession, Elizabeth seized possession of Durham House again, and deprived Tunstall of his see; she kept possession of the residence until 1583, when she granted it to Sir Walter Raleigh. Raleigh spent £2,000 on repairs and lived there until Elizabeth's death. John Aubrey said that he well remembered the room which Raleigh used as his study; it was in a little turret that looked over the Thames and had a view of Westminster, Whitehall Palace and the Surrey hills.

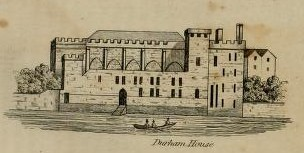
Durham House, view from the River Thames, from Thomas Allen's History and Antiquities of London

It was in Durham House that Raleigh hosted Manteo and Wanchese, the first Native American Algonquin Indians to travel to England from the New World. In 1584 Sir Walter Raleigh had dispatched the first of a number of expeditions to Roanoke island to explore and eventually settle the new land of Virginia. Early encounters with the natives were friendly and, despite the difficulties in communication, the explorers were able to persuade "two of the savages, being lustie men, whose names were Wanchese and Manteo" to accompany them on the return voyage to London.

Once safely delivered to England, the two Indians quickly made a sensation at the royal court. Raleigh's priority however was not publicity but rather intelligence about his new land of Virginia, and he restricted access to the exotic newcomers, assigning the scientist Thomas Harriot the job of deciphering and learning the Carolina Algonquian language, using a phonetic alphabet of his own invention in order to effect the translation.

Upon Elizabeth's death and Raleigh's resultant loss of influence at court, Tobias Matthew, then bishop of Durham, reclaimed Durham House for the see and offered it for use of the Privy Council. The new king, James I of England, approved the move.

=== Decline ===
Neither Matthew nor any of his successors resided at Durham House and it became dilapidated as a result. The stables were demolished for construction of the New Exchange, a market which was occupied by milliners and seamstresses in shops along upper and lower tiers on each side of a central alley. In the 1630s it was the setting for the Durham House Group, including Richard Neile, William Laud and other high church Anglicans.

The best portion of the house was tenanted by Thomas Coventry, 1st Baron Coventry "Lord Keeper Coventry", who died there in 1640. What remained of the house was subsequently obtained by Philip Herbert, 5th Earl of Pembroke. He rented it from the see for £200 per year and intended to build a fine house on the site, which was never realised. Pembroke engaged the architect John Webb who made several drawings for the house. Webb's design followed patterns from an unexecuted pattern created by Justus Vingboons for Amsterdam's Town Hall; Webb's Durham House plan would in turn influence Christopher Wren. Instead, Pembroke built on a site in Durham Street, which ran through the old remains down to the River Thames and the upper portion of which survives at its junction with the Strand. It is a short, steep street that descends under the headquarters of the Society of Arts and disappears in the gloom of the dark arches of the Adelphi.

The last portion of the ruins was cleared away early in the reign of King George III (1760-1820), when the brothers Robert Adam and James Adam constructed the Adelphi Buildings thereby raising the whole level on lofty arches.

== See also ==
Other Strand mansions:

- Somerset House
- York House, Strand

== Sources ==
- Durham House (LondonOnline)
- de Lisle, Leanda (2008): The Sisters Who Would Be Queen: Mary, Katherine and Lady Jane Grey. A Tudor Tragedy Ballantine Books ISBN 978-0-345-49135-0
- Ives, Eric (2009): Lady Jane Grey: A Tudor Mystery Wiley-Blackwell ISBN 978-1-4051-9413-6

== Bibliography ==
- Borer, Mary Cathcart. The City of London: A History. (NY: McKay, 1977) (pp 157)
- Milton, Giles, Big Chief Elizabeth - How England's Adventurers Gambled and Won the New World, Hodder & Stoughton, London (2000)
- Stone, Lawrence. Family and Fortune: Studies in Aristocratic Finance in the Sixteenth and Seventeenth Centuries. (Oxford: Clarendon, 1973) (pp 96–97, 100, 103)
- Stow, John A Survey of London. Reprinted from the Text of 1603. Ed. Charles Lethbridge Kingsford. 2 vols. (Oxford: Clarendon, 1908) (2:400)
- Williams, Neville (1971). Henry VIII and His Court. Macmillan Pub Co. ISBN 978-0-02-629100-2
