= Ellis Worth =

English actor

Ellis Worth (c. 1587 – 1659), or Woorth, was a noted English actor in the Jacobean and Caroline eras. He was a leading member of two important companies, Queen Anne's Men and Prince Charles's Men.

== Biography ==
Nothing is known of Worth's origins or early life, or the start of his career; he was with the Queen Anne's company by 1615, and continued with the troupe until it dissolved in 1623. The paucity of the extant historical record means that little is known of the roles he played; he was most likely the "Ellis" who played a Lord in Robert Daborne's The Poor Man's Comfort around 1617. After 1623, Worth was a member of what is usually called the Company of the Revels at the Red Bull Theatre, and sometimes simply the Red Bull company; little is known of their activities.

When Richard Gunnell built his Salisbury Court Theatre in 1629, he needed a company to act there. He brought in the new or second version of Prince Charles's Men. Worth was an original member and a "sharer" (partner) in this organization from 1631 to at least 1638, and probably until the theatres were closed in 1642 at the start of the English Civil War. He played Ardelio in the troupe's December 1631 production of Marmion's Holland's Leaguer.

Much of what is known of Worth's career comes from legal documents that pertain to the various controversies in which his companies were involved. The long legal battle between Susan Baskervile and Queen Anne's Men is one obvious example; that lawsuit is often known as the Worth/Baskervile suit, or Worth v. Baskervile, since Worth, due to his leading position in the troupe, was listed first among the roster of actors Baskervile sued. [See: Susan Baskervile.] Worth also testified in the Keep the Widow Waking suit in 1624 (though he testified that he had nothing to do with the play).

The second Prince Charles's company also had a tempestuous and litigious career, and Worth was deeply enmeshed in its controversies. Worth and Andrew Cane, the troupe's leaders, were sued by fellow actor William Bankes in 1635. Bankes invested £100 to become an actor/sharer in the company, but was unhappy with the results.

Even after the theatres were closed, the litigation continued; Worth gave a deposition in a Chancery suit in February 1654, in which, coincidentally, he identifies himself as "of the age of 67 or thereabouts."

Worth's daughter Jane was christened in July 1613. The girl's mother died sometime before 1626, when Worth married the widow of Thomas Holcombe. Their son Elizeus was christened in March 1629.

For a couple of centuries, nothing was known about Worth's later years; even the year of his death was mysterious. The discovery of his last will and testament provided some valuable data on his family and surviving descendants. Regrettably, the will contains no mention of actors; Worth's colleagues had largely passed from the scene by 1659.
