= Holland's Leaguer (play) =

1631 play written by Shackerley Marmion

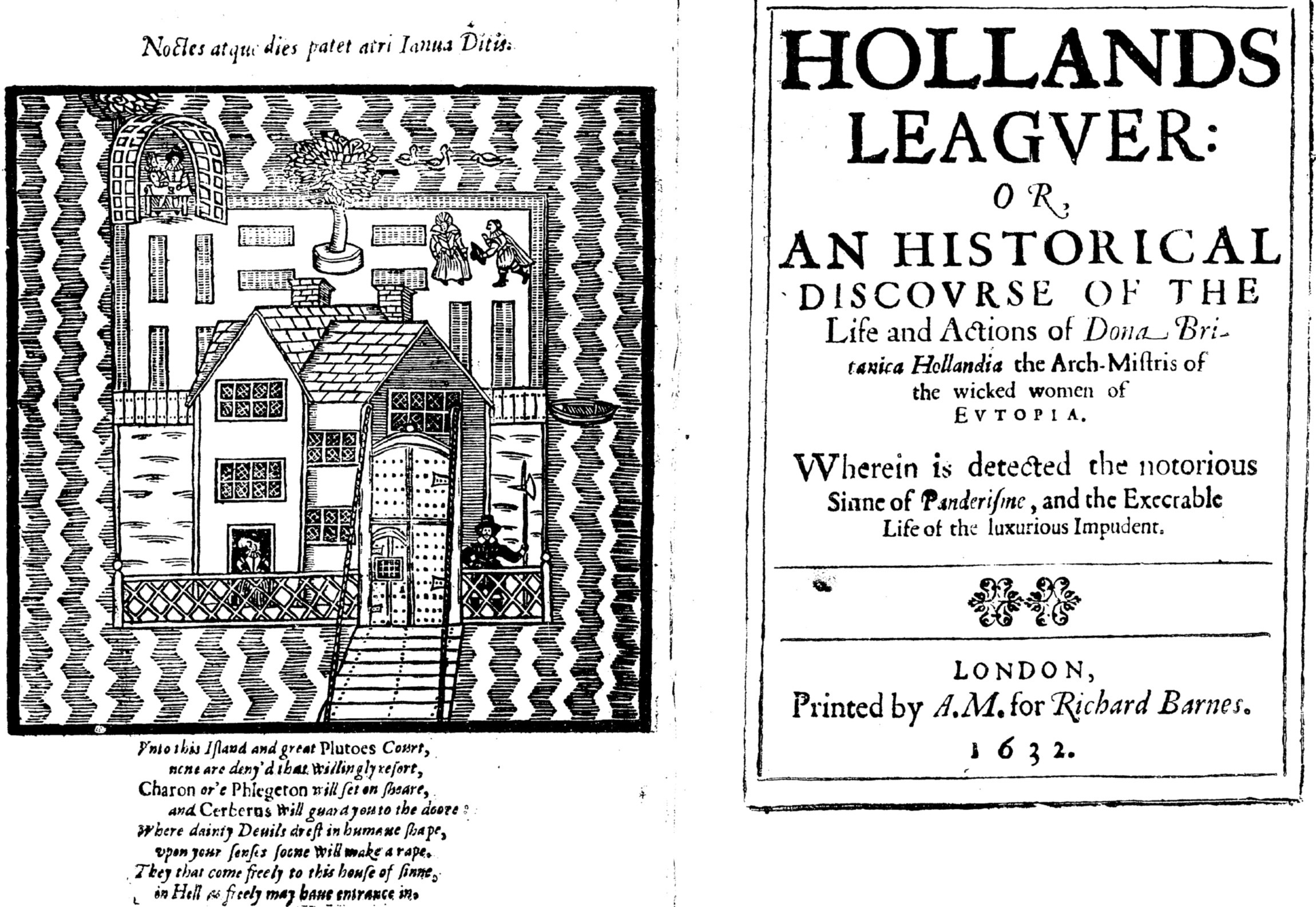
Title page of Holland's Leaguer

Holland's Leaguer is a Caroline stage play, a comedy written by Shackerley Marmion. It premiered onstage in 1631 and was first published in 1632. The play was a popular success and a scandal in its own day—scandalous because it dealt with a well-known London brothel, Holland's Leguer.

== "Leaguer" ==
In its literal sense, the term "leaguer" refers to a military encampment; Shakespeare uses the word in this original sense in All's Well That Ends Well, Act III, scene 6, line 26: "the leaguer of the adversaries." By the 1630s the word had become a slang term for a whorehouse, as here in this play, or in the 1640 play The Knave in Grain.

== Performance ==
Holland's Leaguer was acted in December 1631 by Prince Charles's Men at the Salisbury Court Theatre. It ran for six straight performances – which was highly unusual in the repertory system in which playing companies then operated, with a different play every day. The greatest theatrical success of the era, A Game at Chess, ran for nine straight performances in 1624; The Late Lancashire Witches ran for three straight days in 1634.

(It has been suggested, however, that the six-day run of this play may have been due in part to the thinness of the Princes's Men's repertory, as well as to the genuine popularity of the play.)

The same company would stage Marmion's next play, A Fine Companion, a year or so after his first.

== Publication ==
The play was entered into the Stationers' Register on 26 January 1632, and was published in quarto later that year by the bookseller John Grove. The title page of the first edition states that the drama was acted by "the high and mighty Prince Charles's Men." This was ironic: the company was newly established, under the formal patronage of the then Prince Charles, later King Charles II — who was all of eighteen months old at the time. (An earlier version of the troupe had operated in the 1612–25 period under the same name, when it referred to the baby Charles's father, Charles I.)

Their theatre also was new, first built in 1629 by Richard Gunnell and William Blagrave; the play's Prologue refers to the theatre's location, between the Blackfriars to its east and the Cockpit to its west.

== The cast ==
The first edition also includes a cast list of the original production. This was a new feature in printed playbooks of the time; the earliest had appeared in the first edition of The Duchess of Malfi in 1623, with others following in The Roman Actor (printed 1629), and The Picture and The Renegado ( both printed 1630).

The cast list for Holland's Leaguer gives this information:

Role	Actor
Philautus, a lord enamored of himself	William Browne
Ardelio, his parasite	Ellis Worth
Trimalchio, a humorous gallant	Andrew Cane
Argutes, an impostor	Matthew Smith
Autolicus, his disciple	James Sneller
Capritio, a young novice	Henry Gradwell
Miscellanio, his tutor	Thomas Bond
Snarl, friend to Philautus	Richard Fowler
Fidelio, friend to Philautus	Edward May
Jeffey, tenant to Philautus	Robert Hunt
Triphoena, wife to Philautus	Robert Stratford
Faustina, sister to Philautus	Richard Godwin
Millicent, daughter to Agurtes	John Wright
Margery, her maid	Richard Fouch
Quartilla, gentlewoman to Triphoena	Arthur Savill
Bawd	Samuel Mannery
2 Whores. Pander. Officers	

In addition to being a popular comic actor, Andrew Cane was a working goldsmith who brought his goldsmith apprentices into the theatre, as boy players filling female roles. In this production, both Arthur Savill and John Wright were such apprentice goldsmith/actors. (Wright and Samuel Mannery would be in Beeston's Boys in 1639.)

William Browne, who played the protagonist Philautus, was the son of Robert Browne and Susan Baskervile. Thomas Bond, who played Miscellanio, was William Browne's brother-in-law.

== Place realism ==
Marmion's play is an exercise in "place realism," in which dramatists exploited actual locales around London for their works – something that became fashionable in the drama of the early 1630s. James Shirley's Hyde Park (1632) and Thomas Nabbes's Covent Garden (1633) and Tottenham Court (1634) participated this trend, as did several of the dramas of Richard Brome.

Earlier playwrights had also experimented with place realism, as in Lording Barry's Ram Alley (c. 1607) and Ben Jonson's Bartholomew Fair (1614). Indeed, the publication of Jonson's play in 1631 may have been important in initiating the Caroline fashion. Marmion was one of the Sons of Ben, self-professed followers of Jonson; and Holland's Leaguer bears resemblances to several Jonson plays, most notably The Alchemist.

== The brothel ==
The actual brothel called Holland's Leaguer was located on the Bankside, on the southern shore of the River Thames across from London. It was situated in the liberty of Paris Garden, in a street that is still known as Holland Street. The building had formerly been the Paris Garden manor house, and was equipped with a moat, portcullis, and drawbridge. Brothels were commonly located on the Bankside, to be outside the control of the London civil authorities – just as the theatres were. Henry VIII had suppressed the Bankside whorehouses in the 1540s; but his measures were only temporarily effective.

Holland was reportedly the name of the woman who ran the establishment — though a popular rumour also linked the house specifically with Dutch prostitutes.

The brothel was a topical subject in 1631, because it had been attacked and damaged during the annual Shrove Tuesday tumult by the London apprentices. Shrove Tuesday (the day before Ash Wednesday) was the 'prentices' holiday, and they often celebrated by running wild and causing destruction. (The Cockpit Theatre was damaged in their Shrove Tuesday rioting on 4 March 1617.) Brothels were a regular target of the 'prentices. The play refers directly to this riotous habit, in Act IV scene 3:

Good Sir, let's think on some revenge; call up
The gentleman 'prentices, and make a Shrove Tuesday.

(The 'prentices' Shrove Tuesday riots were sometimes severe. On 24 March 1668, they attacked the London brothels – including the house of Damaris Page, favoured by King Charles's brother the Duke of York, later King James II. The action was so violent that troops had to be called up in response. In the aftermath, eight 'prentices were executed, including four who were hanged, drawn and quartered. Two of their severed heads were set up on London Bridge, to convey a cautionary message to the public.)

== Pamphlet and ballad ==
Marmion was not the only writer to take advantage of the brothel's notoriety. Also in 1632, two other works on the subject appeared: a ballad by Lawrence Price called News from Holland's Leader, and a pamphlet from bookseller Richard Barnes. Authored by a Nicholas Goodman, the pamphlet is titled Holland's Leaguer: or a Historical Discourse of the Life and Actions of Dona Britanica Hollandia, the Arch-Mistress of the wicked women of Eutopis. Wherein is detected the notorious Sin of Panderism, and the Execrable Life of the luxurious impudent. Goodman's essay shows how the subject was perceived (and exploited) at the time, though it offers little dependable information.

(Goodman's pamphlet does contain an interesting fact: the turret on the building's roof provided a view of the three Bankside theatres then standing, the Globe, the Hope, and the decrepit Swan.)

== Synopsis ==
The play's main plot centres upon Philautus, a fashionable young lord; abetted by hangers-on like Ardelio, he has become devoted to vanity and self-absorption – to the displeasure of his wife, Triphoena. Philautus also considers himself a ladies' man (though he is more oriented toward flirting and ego-gratification than actual adultery). His loyal friend Fidelio concocts a scheme to cure Philautus of his follies and restore him to virtue and self-respect. Fidelio wants Philautus to fall in love with a beautiful young woman who will reject him over his shallowness. Fidelio intends it as a therapeutic shock.

For his woman of virtue, Fidelio plans to employ his own fiancé, Faustina. They have been contracted for the past six years; Faustina's father, cool to the match, gained his daughter's promise to live in seclusion for seven years before marrying. Though the father is dead, Faustina loyally maintains her commitment to the seven-year vow. Initially suspicious of the plan, Faustina is won over by Fidelio's arguments. She plays her part in the scheme – which is a success: her rejection shocks Philautus into abandoning his butterfly life. He goes off to the wars in the Netherlands, and returns with honour.

The trick of the matter is that Philautus and Faustina are brother and sister. When he first meets her, Philautus remarks that he has a sister with the same name; but he is no smarter than many other protagonists in English Renaissance comedy, and does not realise that the two Faustinas are one until the final Act of the drama. The six-year separation is supposed to have made them relative strangers. In the realisation scene, Philautus says, "Let me look upon her" — which suggests that she was veiled or masked earlier, making his failure to recognise her perhaps more plausible (somewhat).

The play's subplot deals with a group of would-be gallants, including Triphoena's bashful brother Capritio, his tutor Miscellanio, and the flamboyant Trimalchio. They fall victim to the manipulations of two tricksters, Agurtes and his confederate Autolycus. The subplot is a negative mirror-image of the main plot; as Philautus is tricked out of his vices through his attraction to Faustina, so Capritio and Trimalchio are tricked out of a diamond and a pocket watch by Argutes' daughter Millicent. In pursuit of the gallant's lifestyle, the play's four gulls (Ardelio, Trimalchio, Capritio, and Miscellanio) end up at Holland's Leaguer in Act IV, where they are more abused than satisfied by the denizens of Mistress Holland's house. They think they are arrested by the constables and the night watch — though these are actually Argutes and Autolicus and their henchmen, disguised.

In the end, Ardelio is dismissed by Philautus, and the other gulls are reformed, at least to the point of entering into the marriages that normally end a comedy. Trimalchio marries Millicent, under the illusion that she is a duke's daughter; Capritio marries her maid Margery, while Miscellanio weds Quartilla, Triphoena's gentlewoman.
