= John Rhodes (17th century) =

John Rhodes (fl. 1624 – 1665) was a theatrical figure of the early and middle seventeenth century. He rose to a brief prominence in 1660 when the London theatres re-opened at the start of the English Restoration era.

== Beginning ==
Rhodes was connected with the King's Men during the final phase of the development of English Renaissance drama. On 6 December 1624, Sir Henry Herbert, the Master of the Revels, listed Rhodes among the "necessary attendants," the hired men of the company, who could not be arrested or "pressed for soldiers" without the consent of the Master of the Revels or the Lord Chamberlain. Rhodes served as the wardrobe-keeper at the Blackfriars Theatre. Once the theatres were closed at the start of the English Civil War in 1642, Rhodes, like fellow King's Men Alexander Gough and Andrew Pennycuicke, became a stationer, or bookseller. Rhodes's shop was at the sign of the Bible, in Charing Cross.

There are also cryptic references to Rhodes being the "keeper" of the Cockpit Theatre from 1644 on. While the London theatres were formally closed from 1642 to 1660, evidence shows that there were repeated efforts to operate the theatres on a clandestine basis; and for some periods, as in 1647, plays were staged with some regularity. [See: Salisbury Court Theatre; William Beeston.] Rhodes may well have been involved in these clandestine theatricals — though the scant evidence of the period prevents any degree of certainty.

== Re-emergence ==
It was in the final phase of the English Interregnum, after the death of Oliver Cromwell, that Rhodes attempted to set himself up as a theatrical manager and producer. In February 1660, when the military dictatorship of General Monck was still in effect and King Charles II had not yet returned, Rhodes obtained a license to open a theatre. He leased and refurbished the old Cockpit Theatre, gathered a troupe of young actors, and began to stage plays. His 1660 production of Shakespeare's Pericles, Prince of Tyre was the first Shakespearean revival of the new era; Thomas Betterton made his stage debut in the title role. (Charles Gildon maintained that Betterton had been Rhodes's apprentice when Rhodes was a bookseller.) Edward Kynaston, famous as the last boy player taking female roles before the first English actresses appeared, is also thought to have acted for Rhodes in 1660. Rhodes hoped to obtain a royal licence for his enterprise — but he was squeezed out in the political machinations of the time; the only royal licencees were Thomas Killigrew and Sir William Davenant. Rhodes's already-established company formed the nucleus of Davenant's new Duke's Company (though Kynaston moved to the rival King's Company).

== Decline ==
The failure of his London enterprise did not mean that Rhodes abandoned drama. For a time he maintained a travelling company of players that toured outside London, and occasionally visited the capital. In London, Rhodes's troupe performed at the Cockpit and the Red Bull — old theatres abandoned by the two licensed companies, which were building new and modern facilities in this period. Rhodes's travelling troupe seems to have passed out of existence after 1662, likely due to continued opposition from the better-established rival organizations. On 17 October 1663, Rhodes received a payment of £20 for a Court performance of Ignoramus, or the Academical Lawyer (Ferdinando Parkhurst's translation of George Ruggle's old Latin play Ignoramus) at Whitehall Palace on 1 November 1662 — though the cast in that performance seems to have been composed, surprisingly, of Duke's Company members.

Rhodes's attempt to start his theatre company involved him in a series of legal disputes that played out over the coming years. In a 1665 deposition, Rhodes identified himself as being then in his 60s, and at that time a draper in the London parish of St Giles Cripplegate.

== See also ==
- George Jolly
