= Susan Baskervile =

British theatre manager

- Born: Susan Shore
- Died: 1648
- Spouses: Robert Browne (?-1603, his death); Thomas Greene (?-1612, his death); James Baskervile (m.1613)
- Children: 6: 5 with Browne,1 with Greene

Susan Shore Browne Greene Baskervile (died 1648), or Baskerville, was one of the most influential and significant women involved in English Renaissance theatre, as theatre investor, litigant, and wife, widow, and mother of actors.

Her first husband was Robert Browne (died 1603), actor and manager of the Boar's Head Theatre. She was his second wife. Her five children by Browne included William Browne, who would act with Queen Anne's Men and Prince Charles's Men in the years between 1616 and his death in 1634. Her second husband was the famous clown Thomas Greene, who performed with Queen Anne's Men and who died young in August 1612. (They had a daughter, Honor.) Susan married her third husband, James Baskervile, in June 1613; he was a bigamist who abandoned her and fled to Ireland in 1617.

Thomas Greene's last will and testament, dated 25 July 1612, left his share in Queen Anne's Men, worth 80 pounds, to his wife. (More precisely, he willed her the value of his share; only actors could be sharers.) At the time of his death, the company owed Greene an additional £37 10 s., which also passed to Susan. In 1615, after negotiations, the Baskerviles agreed to invest another £57 10 s. in the company; in return they would be paid one shilling and eight pence every day the company played a play, for the remainder of their (the Baskerviles') lifetimes. The company quickly fell behind in its payments; in 1616 the troupe raised the Baskervile pension to 3 s. 8 d., in return for another investment of £38. The Queen's Men still could not meet their payments to Susan Baskervile, and also failed to pay her son William who was acting with them. Susan Baskervile sued Ellis Worth and other members of the Queen's Men. Susan Baskervile won her suit in 1623 — which forced the acting company to break up.

The long and complex lawsuit, generally called the Baskervile or Worth/Baskervile suit, solicited depositions from most members of the company, generating a documentary record that is valuable for scholars of English Renaissance drama. "Her legal actions have provided much of our knowledge of Queen Anne's Company and of the duties, salaries, and grievances of hired men in the dramatic companies." Christopher Beeston and Thomas Heywood, among others, gave testimony on the side of Baskervile, while Richard Baxter among others gave testimony for the actors. Richard Perkins, great actor that he was, gave a deposition favoring Baskervile on 13 October 1623, and another favoring the actors a day later.

In his 1634 will, William Browne made his mother his executor; with William's death in November of that year, Susan Baskervile acquired control of William's share in the Red Bull company, so called after the theatre it occupied. Within a year, Baskervile was involved in litigation with William's widow Anne Browne.

Susan Baskervile also invested in the second Fortune Theatre, rebuilt after the original burned down in 1621. Another lawsuit, begun in 1637, reveals that Baskervile owned one of the 24 shares in that theatre through the end of the period of English Renaissance drama, when the theatres were closed in September 1642 at the start of the English Civil War. The suit was still active in 1648, when Baskervile filed a deposition in the matter.

Baskervile signed legal documents with her initials only, a fact taken by some commentators as an indication of illiteracy.
