= King and Queen's Young Company =

17th-century English acting troupe

Beeston's Boys was the popular and colloquial name of The King and Queen's Young Company, a troupe of boy actors of the Caroline period, active mainly in the years 1637–1642.

== Origin ==
The troupe was formed in early 1637, under a royal warrant, by the theatre manager and impresario Christopher Beeston, during a time of disorder and reorganisation in the theatre profession; the London playhouses had been closed since the summer of 1636 because of bubonic plague. The creation of a company of boy actors was a return to a practice of the early 17th century, the era of companies like the Children of Paul's and the Children of the Chapel. Those companies, while controversial in their time, had been effective at developing and educating young talent, to the eventual benefit of the adult companies and the theatrical profession as a whole. Beeston's formation of the Young Company was an attempt to recover that training function – as well as to provide effective drama while paying relatively less in actors' salaries.

(A similar attempt to form a boy's company had been made eight years previously, in 1629, by Richard Gunnell, who built the Salisbury Court Theatre. But it was not a success, because of a long theatre closure due to plague.)

The King and Queen's Young Company was onstage in early 1637, and was a hit; they and their reputation quickly entered public consciousness under their popular nickname. Yet the theatrical profession, in a time of plague and looming revolution, remained challenging; when Christopher Beeston died in 1638, his control of acting troupes and theatres (the Cockpit and the Red Bull) passed to his son and successor William Beeston, who was notably less successful than his father. (This period of crisis would likely have been difficult to navigate, even for a very resourceful individual.) William Beeston inherited the Phoenix theatre from his father and everything that went with it, which included the young company Beeston's Boys. While Beeston had none of the experience that his father had, he still took on the mantle of managing the company since he had "a one-twelfth interest in the King and Queen’s young company"

== The owner ==
Christopher Beeston was a very talented man that "managed five Phoenix companies: Queen Anne's (1617–19), Prince Charles’s (1619–22), Lady Elizabeth’s (1622–5), Henrietta Maria’s (1625–37) and the King and Queen’s Young company". Beeston already had an immense amount of experience in the theatre profession from managing these companies and he also had the copyright to many of the plays performed at the Phoenix, which was very unordinary at the time. Beeston's Boys performed plays including Cupid's Revenge, The Knight of the Burning Pestle and The Court Beggar. The last play, The Court Beggar, got Beeston's Boys in a severe amount of trouble that resulted in William Davenant taking over the theatre for an interim time. By possessing such a large repertoire, the Beeston's Boys were able to quickly get up and running and compete with such acting companies like the Queen's Men. William Beeston was then sworn as governor of the company to succeed his father on 5 April 1639 (Bentley 1:330)

== Personnel ==
Beeston's boys were older than the pre-pubescent actors of the previous generation; they tended to be adolescents and young men in their 20s, and included some older Shareholders in the company. The company was one of the first hybrid acting companies of young adults and already established actors. Some veterans from Queen Henrietta's Men, the previous occupants of Beeston's Cockpit Theatre, joined the new group: Ezekiel Fenn, a boy player experienced in female roles; Theophilus Bird; Robert Axell; John Page; and George Stutfield, who apparently moved from performance to management. These older men were also believed to act as the instructors of the younger members, and the title of "teacher" was not vested entirely in one man. It was instead given to anyone answerable to the authority and who were also shareholders in the company. In 1638, Nicholas Burt came from the King's Men, and stayed with Beeston's Boys until the theatres closed in 1642.

A roster of the troupe from 1639 also lists Robert Cox, Edward Davenport, Edward Gibbes, John Lacy, Samuel Mannery, Michael Mohun, Robert Shatterell, William Trigg, and John Wright. Both Mannery and Wright had played female roles in Holland's Leaguer in 1631, with Prince Charles's Men. Edward Gibbes had been with the King's Revels Men, and was an accomplished fencer. Upon Charles' Death in 1639, his son William took charge. Williams first move, as manager, was to have Richard Brome, a poet and dramatist for the Salisbury Court, secured for seven years as the chief poet for the Cockpit.

== The opening ==
During the long hiatus of theatre due to the bubonic plague, Beeston was planning a new company to inhabit the Phoenix, without the permission of the Lord Chamberlain. The opening performance of Beeston's Boys did get Beeston into trouble; however he received a ratification of the company which was post-dated to after the first performance. This leads scholars to believe that the Lord Chamberlain was stepping in to help the company because of Beeston's favour with the higher ups.

The relationship between Lord Chamberlain Pembroke and Christopher Beeston was so close that it greatly advantaged the company. "Now running a company of youths...enjoying the Lord Chamberlain’s direct support, and retaining all the old Queen’s Men’s rich repertoire, Beeston’s position was strong indeed" (Butler 113). Beeston had many orders go in his favor, including one which happened a month after his incident of performing a play illegally. The order was that "no plays must be published without the permission of Beeston as manager of the King and Queen’s young company, or his successors in management".

== Controversy ==
In 1640 Beeston's Boys acted a play that offended King Charles I personally, by referring to his failure to suppress the Scottish Presbyterians during his recent expedition to the north. (Though the identity of the play is not known with certainty, Richard Brome's The Court Beggar is perhaps the best candidate. The offending passages did not survive into the printed text.)

William Beeston was sent to the Marshalsea prison on 4 May 1640; Sir Henry Herbert, the Master of the Revels, gave control of the theatres and their associated actors' companies to Sir William Davenant, playwright and manager. During this time Beeston's boys were not nearly as successful due to William Davenant's being busy with other endeavours at the time. Most of his time was possessed by something called "the Army Plot". The Lord Chamberlain did not predict this when he gave the governor position to Davenant, so when Davenant fled the country the Lord Chamberlain was forced to bring William Beeston back. Due to this turn of events, Beeston was released on bail from the prison and reclaimed his position as governor of the Phoenix in 1641.

Also in 1640, Beeston's Boys were combined with adult actors to form the King and Queen's Company.

== Repertory ==
Thanks to the decades-long career of their founder, the Beeston's Boys had a rich repertory of stage plays to draw upon, including works by the best playwrights of the Caroline age. In their short heyday, the boys acted:

- All's Lost by Lust (William Rowley)
- Argalus and Parthenia (Henry Glapthorne)
- The Bloody Banquet ("T. D.")
- The Bondman (Philip Massinger)
- The Bride (Thomas Nabbes)
- The Changeling (Middleton/Rowley)
- The Cid Part 1 (Joseph Rutter)
- The City Nightcap (Robert Davenport)
- The Coronation (James Shirley)
- The Court Beggar (Richard Brome)
- The Cunning Lovers (Alexander Brome?)
- The Example (Shirley)
- A Fair Quarrel (Middleton/Rowley)
- The Grateful Servant (Shirley)
- The Great Duke of Florence (Massinger)
- A Jovial Crew (Brome)
- King John and Matilda (Davenport)
- A Mad Couple Well Matched (Richard Brome)
- The Maid of Honour (Massinger)
- The Maid's Revenge (Shirley)
- A New Way to Pay Old Debts (Massinger)
- The Rape of Lucrece (Thomas Heywood)
- The Renegado (Massinger)
- 'Tis Pity She's a Whore (John Ford)
- The Wedding (Shirley)
- Wit in a Constable (Glapthorne)
- The Young Admiral (Shirley)

This repertoire of plays was interesting considering most of the Beeston's Boys plays were placed in the charge of the Cockpit Theatre, and many of these plays also showed up in the repertoire of the Old Queen Henrietta's Company. Suggesting that many of the members of the Beeston's Boys were formerly members of that company, or associated with them in some way. Christopher Beeston had an order passed that placed the repertoire of plays in the charge of the Cockpit Theatre. This strengthened the Beeston Boys ties to the Cockpit Theatre. Making it impossible for them to continue to produce plays if ever asked to leave the cockpit, and ensured them a theatre to perform at.

== Aftermath ==
Beeston's Boys were disbanded along with every other theatre in London when the Coup d'état led by Oliver Cromwell happened. 2 September 1642 was the day that every theatre company was outlawed from performing. There is not much else that is mentioned about Beeston's Boys after this time, but it is suspected that the company continued acting in the 1650s since there is a reference of William Beeston training another group of boys to take the stage. Beeston made repairs to the theatre in 1650 in the hopes that the company could start anew. Even after the London theatres were closed in 1642, William Beeston maintained a long-term commitment to re-establishing the Beeston's Boys company. He made a significant effort in 1650, during the Interregnum. Contrary to popular opinion, all dramatic activity in London did not cease with the 1642 closing of the theatres; there was a notable burst of activity in the late 1640s – players would perform plays for audiences, the London authorities would suppress them, and players would try again, whenever they thought they could get away with it. In the midst of this activity, William Beeston paid for repairs to the Cockpit Theatre and attempted to gather together a group of "apprentices and covenant servants" to train them for the stage. The effort, unfortunately, came to nothing in a new and harsher round of suppression by local authorities.

Beeston had better luck at the start of the Restoration, when he was able to recruit a new troupe of Beeston's Boys for a time. They played at the Cockpit and the Salisbury Court Theatre in the first few years of the Restoration era.
