= Andrew Cane =

English comic actor

Andrew Cane (fl. 1602–1650) — also Kayne, Kene, Keine, and other variants — was a comic actor in late Jacobean and Caroline era London. In his own generation he was a leading comedian and dancer, and one of the famous and popular performers of his time.

== Beginnings ==
A child with the surname "Keane" (no Christian name recorded) was baptized on 2 March 1589; this might have been the actor/goldsmith. In 1602, Cane began a ten-year apprenticeship to his older brother Richard, who had finished his own apprenticeship and established himself as a goldsmith in 1600. The younger Cane won his "freedom" in the goldsmiths' guild in 1611. Cane married and began a family in 1612.

== Jigging clown ==
Cane's stage career had begun by 1622, when he moved from Lady Elizabeth's Men (at the Cockpit) to the Palsgrave's Men (at the Fortune). After 1631 he was a "chiefe" member of the Prince Charles's Men (II) troupe, and received their payments for their performances at Court.

One of his jobs was dancing the jig that concluded each performance, a traditional task that clowns from Richard Tarlton to John Shank had fulfilled. Like other clowns in this function, Cane used the opportunity of a solo turn on the stage to develop a satiric rapport with his audience. He excelled at the task, and was said to possess "the tongue of Mercury." By the late 1630s, his political satire had grown so sharp that the Privy Council took notice; in 1639 the Council ordered the Attorney General to address the matter of Cane satirizing politicians from the stage of the Red Bull Theatre (though the surviving records do not specify the outcome of the matter).

Cane's stage career was not limited by the official scrutiny. His fame led to non-theatrical expressions: in 1641 a pamphlet titled The Stage Players Complaint was printed, which portrays Cane and another famous clown, Timothy Read, exchanging witticisms on the issues of the day, and talking up the worth and value of playacting.

== Goldsmith ==
A number of figures in English Renaissance drama maintained formal membership in the guilds of London; this allowed them to bind apprentices to contracts, something that actors, as retainers in noble households, could not legally do under the system of the time. Most of these men kept only a formal guild membership: John Heminges maintained his membership in the grocers' guild, but didn't peddle groceries; Ben Jonson kept his membership in the bricklayers' guild, but didn't lay bricks. Andrew Cane, however, was one of a number of actors who pursued a career beyond the stage; he was a member of the goldsmiths' guild and an active goldsmith. He crossed his two careers without hesitation, turning his goldsmithing apprentices into boy actors. The 14-year-old Arthur Savill was apprenticed to Cane the goldsmith on 5 August 1631 — and before the end of the year he was playing Quartilla, one of the female roles in Shackerley Marmion's Holland's Leaguer. The same production featured, in the role of Millicent, the 17-year-old John Wright, who'd become a Cane apprentice in 1629.

(Other theatre figures of the time — actors Robert Armin and John Lowin and manager Robert Keysar — came from or maintained membership in the goldsmiths' guild. Evidence of their activity as goldsmiths, however, is lacking.)

The records of the parish of St. Giles without Cripplegate (which was near the Fortune Playhouse and the home of many theatre people) state that a foundling child called Hester, "her parents unknown," was christened on 18 April 1628; she is noted as having been "taken up" at Andrew Cane's "stall," his place of business.

== Aftermath ==
After the theatres were closed in 1642 at the start of the English Civil War, Cane was an active supporter of the Royalist cause. By 1644, goldsmith Cane was coining the Royalists' debased coinage; he may have had to spend time in prison as a result. Cane did not abandon acting permanently, however. On 22 January 1650, he was one of eight performers arrested at the Red Bull Theatre, for play-acting against the regulations of the Commonwealth regime.

In 1654 Cane became involved in a lawsuit with actor William Wintershall and his wife, over a thirty-year-old debt of £40. The debt stemmed from a 1624 agreement between theater manager Richard Gunnell and a group of actors, one of whom was Cane. Wintershall had married Gunnell's daughter Margaret in the early 1640s, and so was drawn into the matter. The outcome of the suit is unknown.

The date of Cane's death is also unknown. His son Edward and grandson Andrew continued Cane's trade — not as actors, but goldsmiths.
