= Holland's Leaguer =

Holland's Leaguer may refer to:

- Holland's Leaguer (brothel)
- Holland's Leaguer (play)
