= 1611 in literature =

This article contains information about the literary events and publications of 1611.

== Events ==
- January 1 – Oberon, the Faery Prince, a masque written by Ben Jonson and designed by Inigo Jones, is performed at Whitehall Palace.
- February 3 – Love Freed from Ignorance and Folly, another Jonson/Jones masque, is also staged at Whitehall.
- May 2 – The Authorized King James Version of the Bible appears, printed in London by Robert Barker.
- May 11 – The first known performance of Shakespeare's The Winter's Tale, probably new this year, is given by the King's Men at the Globe Theatre in London.
- November 1 – The King's Men give perhaps the first performance of The Tempest, Shakespeare's last solo play, at Whitehall Palace.
- November 5 – The King's Men perform The Winter's Tale at Whitehall Palace.
- December 26 – The King's Men return to Court with Beaumont and Fletcher's A King and No King.
- December 27 – Queen Anne's Men act one of their most popular plays, Greene's Tu Quoque (The City Gallant; probably written by John Cooke) at Court, having previously performed it at the Red Bull Theatre.
- unknown dates
  - The last known traditional performance of an English mystery play is given at Kendal.
  - Dramatist Juan Ruiz de Alarcón returns to Spain from Mexico.

== New books ==
=== Prose ===
- The Holy Bible, Authorized King James Version
- Antonio Agustín y Albanell - Epitome iuris pontificii veteris (final volume) and De quibusdam veteris canonum ecclesiasticorum collectoribus iudicium ac censura
- Jacques Bongars – Gesta Dei per Francos
- Thomas Coryat – Coryat's Crudities hastily gobbled up in Five Months Travels in France, Italy, &c
- Randle Cotgrave – A Dictionarie of the French and English Tongues
- John Donne – An Anatomy of the World
- Giolla Brighde Ó hEoghusa (Bonaventura Ó hEoghusa or O'Hussey) – An Teagasc Criosdaidhe
- Robert Parker - De Descensu Domini nostri Jesu Christi ad inferos libri quatuor ab auctore doctissimo Hugone Sanfordo Coomflorio Anglo inchoati, opera vero et studio Roberti Parker ad umbilicum perducti ac jam tandem in lucem editi
- Samuel Rowlands – The Knave of Clubs
- John Speed:
  - The Historie of Great Britaine
  - The Theatre of the Empire of Great Britaine (map atlas)

=== Drama ===
- Francis Beaumont and John Fletcher – A King and No King
- George Chapman – May Day (published)
- John Cooke (?) – Greene's Tu Quoque
- Thomas Dekker and Thomas Middleton – The Roaring Girl (published)
- Thomas Dekker – If This Be Not a Good Play, the Devil Is In It
- Thomas Heywood – The Golden Age (published)
- Ben Jonson
  - Oberon, the Faery Prince
  - Love Freed from Ignorance and Folly
  - Catiline His Conspiracy published
- Johannes Messenius – Disa
- Thomas Middleton (attributed to) – The Second Maiden's Tragedy
- Anthony Munday – Chryso-Thriambos
- William Shakespeare
  - The Winter's Tale (probable date)
  - The Tempest (consensus date)
- Cyril Tourneur – The Atheist's Tragedy (published)

=== Poetry ===
See also 1611 in poetry

- Richard Braithwaite – The Golden Fleece
- John Donne – An Anatomy of the World
- Emilia Lanier – Salve Deus Rex Judaeorum

== Births ==
- September 1 – William Cartwright, English dramatist (died 1643)
- October 22 – Jacques Esprit ("abbé Esprit"), French moralist (died 1677)
- October 26 – Antonio Coello, Spanish dramatist and poet (died 1652)
- unknown dates
  - Richard Alleine, English religious writer (died 1681)
  - Charles Alphonse du Fresnoy, French writer on art and painter (died 1665)
  - Thomas Urquhart, Scottish translator (died c. 1660)
- probable year
  - Jean François Sarrazin, French satirist (died 1654)

== Deaths ==
- February 8 – Jan Huyghen van Linschoten, Dutch historian (born 1563)
- March 11 – Giles Fletcher, the Elder, English poet and diplomat (born c. 1548)
- March 20 – Johann Georg Gödelmann, German demonological writer (born 1559)
- April 23 – Martin Ruland the Younger, German alchemist and editor of his father's writings (born 1569)
- June 8 – Jean Bertaut, French poet (born 1552)
- September 22 – Pedro de Ribadeneira, Spanish ecclesiastical historian (born 1527)
- unknown date
  - John Hamilton, Scottish Catholic controversialist (born c. 1547)
