= George Jolly =

George Jolly, or Joliffe (in Germany, Joris Joliphus or Jollifous) (fl. 1640 – 1673) was an actor, an early actor-manager and a theatre impresario of the middle seventeenth century. He was "an experienced, courageous, and obstinate actor-manager" who proved a persistent rival for the main theatrical figures of Restoration theatre, Sir William Davenant and Thomas Killigrew.

== Beginnings ==
Nothing is known of Jolly's early life. He began his acting career c. 1640, at the crisis point of Caroline era theatre and society, when the English Civil War was about to start. The Puritan authorities suppressed the London theatres in September 1642; Jolly, like most actors, playwrights, and poets, was a royalist supporter, and served Prince Charles, then Prince of Wales, in Paris until 1646. Jolly eventually organised a company of fourteen actors, his English Comedian Players, and led them around Europe from 1648 to 1659. They began in Germany, and were in Poland and Sweden in 1649 and 1650. They regularly performed in Vienna and Frankfurt, and may have performed before the future King Charles II in Frankfurt in September 1655. The company came to include German as well as English actors over time, and apparently adapted its personnel to the countries in which it operated. Jolly also brought woman actors onto the stage in Germany in 1654, anticipating the greatest innovation of the Restoration theatre in England by several years. At the Krachbein (an inn in Frankfurt), Jolly used a tennis court ("Ballhaus") as a theatre, another technique that would be followed later in London, at Lisle's Tennis Court and Gibbon's Tennis Court.

== Restoration ==
With the end of the Interregnum period and the return of Charles to the throne, the London theatres re-opened; in August 1660 Killigrew and Davenant received a patent to establish two theatre companies under royal patronage, the King's Company and the Duke's Company respectively – their famous "duopoly." Jolly had set up his own acting troupe by November 1660; on 24 December 1660, Jolly obtained his own patent from the King to run a company and theatre. Jolly's 1660 company was apparently made up mostly of personnel from William Beeston's last effort, and acted at first at the Cockpit Theatre. By March 1661 they were at the old Red Bull Theatre, where Samuel Pepys saw them perform William Rowley's All's Lost by Lust. They were working in the Salisbury Court Theatre by September of that year. Soon, though, they were back at the Cockpit; Jolly's company appears to have worked in whatever theatre was available to them. Their repertory probably included Marlowe's Doctor Faustus; Pepys and his wife saw a performance of that play at the Red Bull on 26 May 1662, though he found it "so wretchedly done that we were sick of it." (The 1663 edition of Faustus may reflect the version of the play that Jolly staged.)

Jolly maintained a toehold in London for two years, though the erstwhile rivals Davenant and Killigrew united in opposing his presence in the capital as strenuously as they could. On 1 and 29 January 1663, Jolly was granted new licenses (from Master of the Revels Sir Henry Herbert and from the King respectively) to play in any city in England except for London and Westminster; he led his troupe on a tour of provincial cities. Norwich became a de facto base of operations for Jolly's company, where they played at the King's Arms Inn; their repertory in this period appears to have included Massinger's A New Way to Pay Old Debts, Cooke's Greene's Tu Quoque, Ford's 'Tis Pity She's a Whore, and the Fletcher/Shirley play The Night Walker among other works.

During this time, Jolly leased his London license to Killigrew and Davenant for £4 weekly. They falsely claimed that Jolly had sold them his license, which led to its revocation in July 1667. After 1667, Davenant and Killigrew were able to mollify Jolly somewhat by putting him in charge of "the Nursery", a school for the training of young actors.

== Touring ==
Jolly still maintained his touring troupe; they remained successful at playing cities outside London – provided they didn't stay too long. In 1669 the city authorities of Norwich complained about Jolly to the King; the actors' popularity with the town's cloth workers had led Jolly to stay there for three months, and the town fathers were worried over his impact on the wool trade.

Jolly was left behind in one key development of Restoration dramaturgy: the use of scenery. The London patent companies built larger and more elaborate theatres for themselves, equipped with ever more advanced resources for the scenes and properties needed for the spectaculars of the era. Jolly's touring companies had to travel light, as the touring companies of English Renaissance theatre had done in previous generations. Jolly therefore preserved the last remnant and vestige of the theatre of the previous age into the Restoration era.

== Character ==
The available evidence indicates that theatre managers of this age, from Philip Henslowe and Francis Langley to Christopher Beeston, were sometimes (often, regularly) ruthless and unscrupulous. Jolly was cut from the same cloth. (His name was a malapropism and a misnomer: Jolly wasn't jolly.) He has been characterised as an "irascible" man "whose hot temper made it difficult for him to keep a company together." Alfred Harbage wrote that Jolly "always proved venal in proportion to his opportunities, and it is difficult to feel much sympathy for him."

== See also ==
- John Rhodes
