= Robert Browne (Jacobean actor) =

Robert Browne (c. 1563 – c. 1622) was an English actor and theatre manager and investor of the later sixteenth and early seventeenth centuries. He was also part of a long-standing confusion in the scholarship of English Renaissance theatre.

== Two Robert Brownes ==
The historical records of English Renaissance drama contain repeated mentions of "Robert Browne." Early scholars like E. K. Chambers and Edwin Nunzeger interpreted the records to indicate a single individual. Later scholars, principally Charles Jasper Sisson and Herbert Berry, demonstrated that two different men of the same name had been confused and conflated together.

The "other" Robert Browne died in 1603, and so can accurately be termed an Elizabethan actor. The Robert Browne who is the subject of this article had a career that extended through the first two decades of the seventeenth century, and in that sense can, as a differentiation, be called a Jacobean actor.

== At home and abroad ==
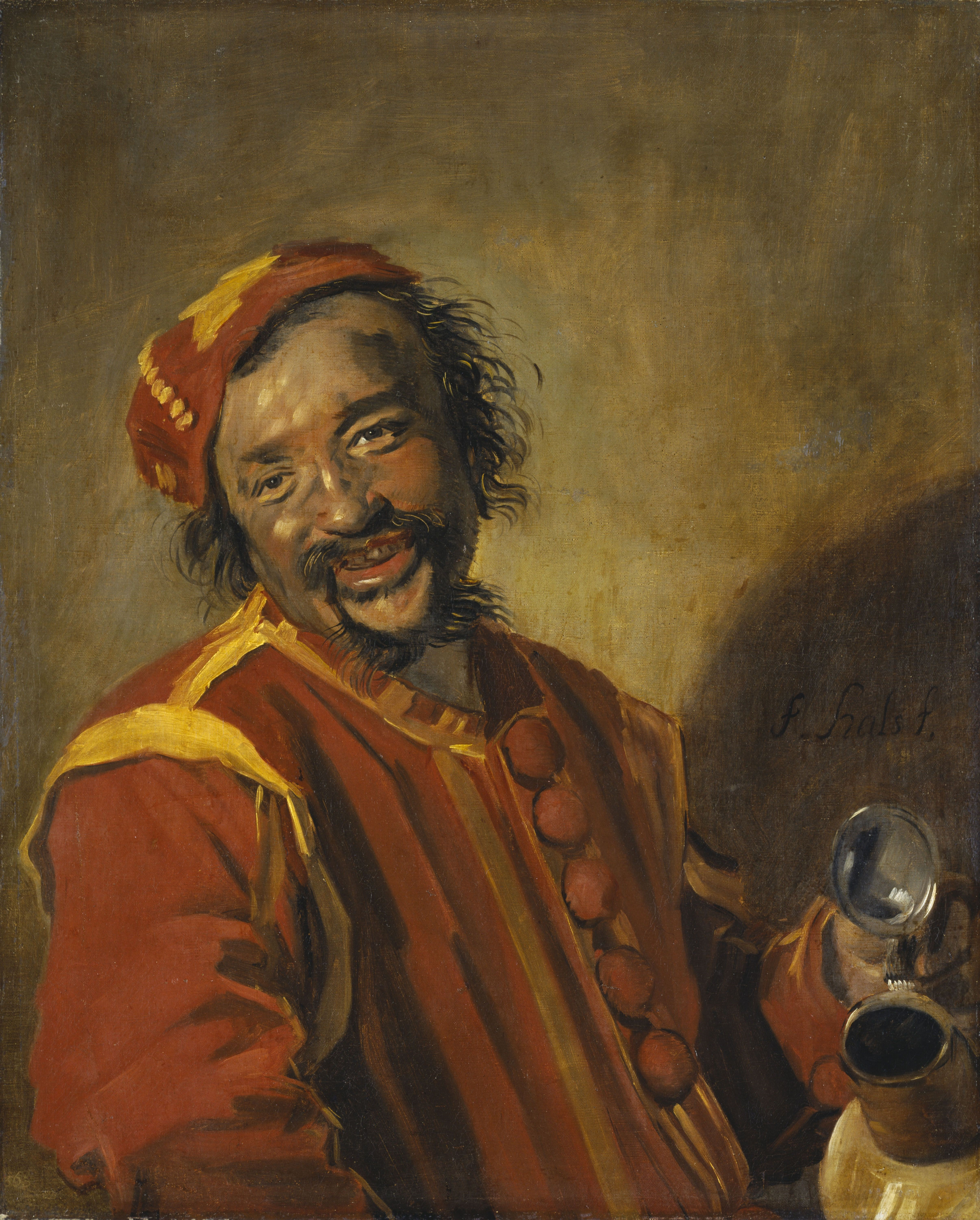
Peeckelhaeringh, by Frans Hals

Born in 1563, Robert Browne's acting career began by the time he was twenty years old, when he was a member of Worcester's Men (1583). He was one of the English actors who performed on the Continent, especially in Germany, where English actors were especially favored. (Some names are known: Thomas Sackville, a clown; John Broadstreet, a "springer", accompanied by Richard Jones, a musician). Browne worked in Holland in 1590, and for Henry Julius, Duke of Brunswick-Lüneburg in Wolfenbüttel, in Frankfurt and Nuremberg in the 1592–94 period. He was in Germany again from 1601 through 1607, and once more in 1618–20. This does not mean Browne was consistently abroad during those years; rather he passed back and forth between England and the Continent.

Browne was in Frankfurt in September 1602, and in Augsburg later that year; he was in Nuremberg in February 1603. He was in Frankfurt again in 1606; he and other English actors were under the patronage of Maurice, Landgrave of Hesse-Kassel, who had built for the 'Englische Komoedianten', in Kassel 1605, a roofed theatre, the oldest extant such building in Germany, although nowadays used as a wildlife museum; in 1606 and 1607. In 1618 he was with English players in Nuremberg in May, in Strassburg in June and July, and in Frankfurt in the autumn. He spent the winter of 1619–20 in Prague, at the court of Frederick and Elizabeth, King and Queen of Bohemia. He was back in Germany in early 1620.

== Theatre business ==
When William Sly, long a member of the King's Men, died in 1608, he left Robert Browne his share in the Globe Theatre. Browne did not keep the share for long; rather he sold it to Henry Condell and John Heminges in partnership. Browne had a more substantive involvement in theatre investment and management in 1610, when he became one of the patentees of the Children of the Queen's Revels at the Whitefriars Theatre. Browne may have had a specific responsibility for training the young actors in the troupe.

== Family ==
Browne married Cicely (or Sisely) Sands (or Saunders), the sister of actor James Sands, in 1594. Their son Robert was christened on 19 October 1595, their daughter Jane on 2 December 1599. The family resided in Clerkenwell, in the neighborhood of the Red Bull Theatre where many actors and theatre people of the time lived.

After Browne's death, his widow would marry actor William Robbins.
