= Stephen Hammerton =

17th-century English actor

Stephen Hammerton (fl. 1629–47) was a boy player or child actor in English Renaissance theatre, one of the young performers who specialized in female roles in the period before women appeared on the stage. His case illuminates the conditions of boy actors in this era.

== Beginnings ==
Stephen Hammerton was the son of a Richard Hammerton of Hellifield, Yorkshire. In his youth he was apprenticed to a London merchant tailor, William Waverly, of the Strand. At the time, veteran actors Richard Gunnell and William Blagrave, founders of the Salisbury Court Theatre, were struggling to form a new company of child actors, similar to the Children of the Chapel and the Children of Paul's of thirty years before. Those troupes, famous in their own time, had been highly effective at training young actors and funnelling them into the adult companies that needed their talent; but the troupes of boy players had been defunct for nearly fifteen years when Blagrave and Gunnell started their Children of the Revels troupe in 1629. The relevant documents indicate clearly that part of the project's rationale was the training of young actors for the King's Men at the Blackfriars Theatre.

Blagrave had encountered the young Hammerton and decided that the Children of the Revels needed him. Blagrave purchased the remaining nine years of Hammerton's apprenticeship contract from Waverly in October 1629. (Hammerton allegedly agreed to this change; it happened "by and with his own liking.") This was not a unique transaction; there are other instances on record in which actors and theatre managers effectively bought the services of boys for their troupes.

== King's Men ==
Unfortunately, the new boys' company failed to attain success, because of a long closure of the theatres due to bubonic plague at the time. According to one report, the boys were left without adequate food and clothing; fourteen boys had seven shirts among them, and one of the fourteen died of neglect. Hammerton fared better, though; sometime in 1632 he jumped to, or was recruited into, the King's Men. His transition was not without controversy; manager Blagrave was involved in a lawsuit over control of the apprentice actor. In November 1632, Blagrave joined with William Beeston in a petition to the Lord Chamberlain to recover custody of Hammerton. Beeston's involvement in the matter is cryptic, and the Blagrave/Beeston suit was unsuccessful; Hammerton remained with the King's Men and acted for them for the next ten years, till the theatres were closed in September 1642 at the start of the English Civil War.

== Female to male ==
Hammerton started out by playing female roles, as would be expected; in 1632 he played Oriana, the heroine in John Fletcher's The Wild Goose Chase. In 1633, when William Prynne published Histriomastix, the Players' Scourge, his famous attack on the theatre and the players, he singled out Hammerton as "a most noted and beautiful woman-actor." By the late 1630s Hammerton transitioned from female to male roles. He played in Sir John Suckling's The Goblins, James Shirley's The Doubtful Heir, and Thomas Killigrew's The Parson's Wedding. Amyntor in the Beaumont and Fletcher play The Maid's Tragedy was the type of "juvenile lead" part for which he became famous. He acquired a reputation as a sort of 17th-century matinee idol, especially favored by the young women in the audience. The Epilogue to The Goblins comments on Hammerton's popularity:

The women — Oh if Stephen should be killed,
Or miss the lady, how the plot is spilled?

Killigrew makes the same point at the end of The Parson's Wedding: if "Stephen misses the Wench...that alone is enough to spoil the Play." (Hammerton's celebrity was such that he was identifiable by his first name alone — much like celebrities of later centuries.)

Hammerton was made a Groom of the Chamber on 22 January 1641, along with five other King's Men. After the theatres closed in 1642, Hammerton's fortunes, like those of the other King's Men, were eclipsed and obscured. He was one of the ten King's Men who signed the dedication to the first Beaumont and Fletcher folio in 1647.
