= The Poor Man's Comfort =

The Poor Man's Comfort is a Jacobean era stage play, a tragicomedy by Robert Daborne — one of his two extant plays.

== Date, performance, publication ==
The play's date is uncertain, though it is generally assigned to the 1610–18 era. It was not published until several decades after it was written.

The Poor Man's Comfort was entered into the Stationers' Register on 20 June 1655, and published in quarto later that year by the booksellers Robert Pollard and John Sweeting. Both the Register entry and the title page of the quarto refer to Daborne as a "Master of Arts."

In the original text, a stage direction at line 186 reads "Enter 2 Lords, Sands, Ellis." The names refer not to the characters of the play but the actors who played the roles — a feature that occurs on rare occasions in the texts of English Renaissance drama. (See, for example, Sir John van Olden Barnavelt.) The two actors may have been Gregory Sanderson and Ellis Worth, who played with Queen Anne's Men.

The title page of the quarto states that the play was performed at the Cockpit Theatre, which was occupied by the Queen Anne's company from 1617 to 1619. If the title page describes the original production, the most likely single year for the play might be narrowed to 1617, since Daborne is thought to have stopped writing for the stage by 1618.

The drama was revived early in the Restoration era, in 1661 — which was its last known stage production.

A manuscript of the work is preserved in MS. Egerton 1994, an important collection of play manuscripts now in the British Library.

== Sources ==
Daborne based his play on the seventh story in William Warner's Pan His Syrinx (1584, 1597). Warner's story collection, his "sevenfold history," also served as Thomas Middleton's source for The Bloody Banquet. The title of the play is proverbial: "Virtue is the friend of life, the soul of health, the poor man's comfort and the rich man's wealth" is one among several versions.

== The plot ==
The play tells the story of Gisbert, an old shepherd whose daughter, Urania, has been deserted by her husband, a nobleman from Thessaly. Gisbert fails to receive justice from a local court, and leaves his pastoral life to take a journey through a corrupt society. His story involves lovestruck shepherds, shipwrecked princesses, corrupt and venal lawyers, and violent whores. He finally attains justice from his king. Critics have praised the play for keeping Gisbert and Urania as shepherds till the end — not revealing them to be lost royalty or aristocrats in hiding, as is usual in the pastoral form. For Felix Schelling, the play "is quite enough to raise Daborne, hack-writer though he was, to a respected place among the dramatists of his day."

Philip Massinger and Nathan Field my have borrowed from Daborne's play when they wrote their collaboration The Fatal Dowry. Gisbert's confrontation with his daughter Urania and her husband Lucius appears to have suggested the dramatic scene in the later play in which Rochfort confronts his daughter Beaumelle and her husband Charalois.

== Modern editions ==
The play was edited by Kenneth Palmer for the Malone Society in 1954. A more recent edition of the play was published in 2005.
