= Queen's Men (disambiguation) =

The Queen's Men can refer to any of three acting companies:

- Queen Elizabeth's Men 1583–94
- Queen Anne's Men 1603–16
- Queen Henrietta's Men 1625–36
