= Richard Gunnell =

17th-century English actor, playwright, and theatre manager

Richard Gunnell (fl. 1613 – 1634) was an actor, playwright, and theatre manager in Jacobean and Caroline era London. He is best remembered for his role in the founding of the Salisbury Court Theatre.

== Actor and playwright ==
Nothing is known of Gunnell's early life or the first phase of his stage career. He acted with the Admiral's Men, then called the Palsgrave's Men, from 1613 to 1622. When the Palsgrave's Men received their renewed charter and their new name on 4 January 1613, Gunnell was already a sharer in the company. Despite the scantiness of the documentary record for the Palsgrave's troupe, Gunnell can be seen moving up into a managerial responsibility over his years with the company. In the 1613 charter he is listed twelfth of the fourteen sharers. On the company's 1618 lease of the Fortune Playhouse from owner Edward Alleyn, Gunnell is fourth of ten. And when the company leased the rebuilt Fortune in 1622, Gunnell is listed first.

The fire that destroyed the Fortune on 9 December 1621 also wiped out the costumes and play manuscripts of the Palsgrave's Men. In the difficult period that followed, Gunnell appears to have left acting to concentrate of management. He also made a venture at writing plays. His comedy The Hungarian Lion appeared in 1623, and his The Way to Content All Women, or How a Man May Please His Wife followed in 1624. Neither of his plays has survived.

== Salisbury Court ==
Gunnell partnered with William Blagrave, Sir Henry Herbert's assistant in the office of the Master of the Revels, to establish the Salisbury Court Theatre in 1629. The Salisbury Court was one of the so-called "private" theatres of the era, comparable to the Blackfriars or the Cockpit, as opposed to the "public" theatres like the Fortune or the Globe that catered to a broad audience. Since the private theatres were prestigious and lucrative – their minimum ticket price was five or six times higher than the public theatres' penny – the move from public to private made business sense, and Gunnell was not the first theatre manager to pursue this course. (Christopher Beeston, manager of the public Red Bull Theatre, built the private Cockpit in 1616–17.)

Along with their new theatre, Gunnell and Blagrave intended to start their own new acting company, called the Children of the Revels. Their plan was to organize a troupe of boy players, comparable to the boys' companies of the previous generation, the Children of the Chapel and the Children of Paul's. (Christopher Beeston would make the same effort, though more fortunately, when he started Beeston's Boys in 1637.) The Blagrave/Gunnell troupe was not a success, since an outbreak of bubonic plague forced the London theatres to close in 1630 – though Stephen Hammerton, the popular young actor who found fame with the King's Men, emerged from it.

Business difficulties apparently tempted Gunnell to try to sell his theatrical enterprise; but he and the buyer, Christopher Babham, could not agree on terms and soon went to court over their disagreement. Gunnell remained in the theatre, and brought the re-organized Prince Charles's Men (a troupe that included some of his old Palsgrave's compatriots) into the Salisbury Court in 1631.

== End ==
Gunnell was a longtime resident of the London parish of St. Giles without Cripplegate; the parish records note the christenings and burials of several Gunnell children between 1613 and 1631. He "died late in 1634 or 1635." Gunnell died intestate, leaving a widow, Elizabeth, and two daughters, Margaret and Anne. Elizabeth later married a John Robinson, who may have been the actor of that name; Margaret married actor William Wintershall.
