= Actor-manager =

Actor who manages their own theatrical company and usually stars in its productions

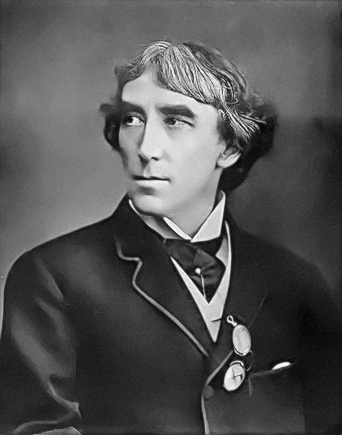
Actor-manager Henry Irving

An actor-manager is a leading actor who sets up their own permanent theatrical company and manages the business, sometimes taking over a theatre to perform select plays in which they usually star. It is a method of theatrical production used consistently since the 16th century, particularly common in 19th-century Britain and the United States.

== History ==
The first actor-managers, such as Robert Browne, appeared in the late 16th century, to be followed by another Robert Browne (no relation) and George Jolly in the 17th century. In the 18th century, actor-managers such as Colley Cibber and David Garrick gained prominence. The system of actor-management generally produced high standards of performance, as demonstrated by such 19th-century actors as William Macready, Charles Wyndham, Henry Irving, Frank Benson and Herbert Beerbohm Tree, by husband-wife teams such as Squire Bancroft and Effie Bancroft, Frank Wyatt and Violet Melnotte, William Hunter Kendal and Madge Robertson Kendal and Thomas and Priscilla German Reed, and by women stars, such as Lucia Elizabeth Vestris, Lucy Escott, Selina Dolaro, Evelyn Millard, Sarah Bernhardt, Sarah Thorne, Gertrude Kingston, Emily Soldene, Laura Keene and Lydia Thompson, among many others.

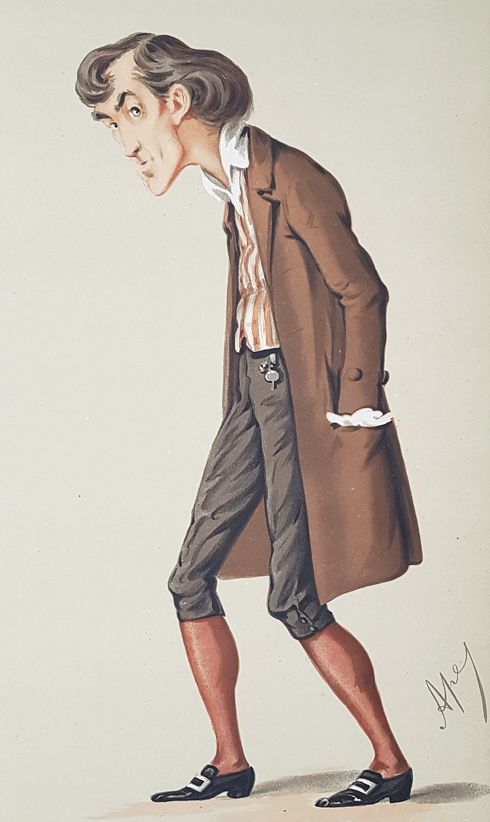
Henry Irving in The Bells, 1874

In the 19th century, the negative reputation of actors was largely reversed, and acting became an honored, popular profession and art. The rise of the actor as celebrity provided the transition, as audiences flocked to their favorite "stars." A new role emerged for the actor-managers who formed their own companies and controlled the actors, the production, and the financing. When successful, they built up a permanent clientele that flocked to their productions. They could enlarge their audience by going on tour across the country, performing a repertoire of well-known plays, such as Shakespeare. The newspapers, private clubs, pubs and coffee shops rang with lively debates palming the relative merits of the stars of their productions. Henry Irving (1838–1905) was the most successful of the British actor-managers. Irving was renowned for his Shakespearean roles, and for such innovations as turning out the house lights so that attention could focus more on the stage and less on the audience. His company toured across Britain, as well as Europe and the United States, demonstrating the power of star actors and celebrated roles to attract enthusiastic audiences. His knighthood in 1895 indicated full acceptance into the higher circles of British society.

The 19th-century repertoire usually consisted of a combination of the works of Shakespeare, popular melodramas, and new dramas, comedies or musical theatre works. The era of the actor-manager was geared to star performances, such as Irving's role in the 1871 play The Bells.

=== 20th century ===
The system of actor-management waned in the early 20th century, as actor-managers were replaced first by stage managers and later by theatre directors. In addition, the system of actor-management was adversely affected by factors such as the increasing cost of mounting theatrical productions, more corporate ownership of theatres, such as by the Theatrical Syndicate, Edward Laurillard and The Shubert Organization, a trend toward ensemble-style acting, and a move towards the financial security offered by long runs rather than rotating plays for a short period. After the end of World War II a combination of social, financial and technological factors, combined with the rising popularity of film and radio, lead to the diminishing of the actor-manager system, with its last two great exponents being Sir Donald Wolfit and Sir Laurence Olivier, both of whom were actively working within a (by then) old fashioned framework.In the USA Jack Aranson, who trained at the Old Vic Theatre School in London, was one of the last actor-managers.

Though no longer the standard practice, modern actor-managers do exist and increasingly fringe work is being explored on this model as actors look to provide themselves with an artistic platform which they have the means to control. Examples include Kevin Spacey when he worked as the artistic director of the Old Vic in London, Samuel West when he briefly ran the Sheffield Crucible and Kenneth Branagh in the Kenneth Branagh Theatre Company.

== Bibliography ==
- Donaldson, Lady Frances Annesley. The Actor Managers Weidenfeld & Nicolson, London (1970)
- Thomas, James. The Art of the Actor-Manager: Wilson Barrett and the Victorian Theatre Bowker (1984)
- Pearson, Hesketh. The Last Actor-Managers Methuen and Co Ltd (1950)
