= Richard Baxter (actor) =

Richard Baxter (c. 1593 – c. 1667), or Backster, was a seventeenth-century actor, who worked in some of the leading theatre companies of his era. His long career illustrates the conditions during the difficult years of transition from the period of English Renaissance theatre, through the English Civil War and the Interregnum, and into the Restoration era.

== Early years ==
Baxter worked with Queen Anne's Men through most of that company's existence, from 1606 to 1623. He was paid 10 shillings a week as a hired man; he became a sharer (a partner in the company) in 1623, the year the company folded. Unfortunately, that company was in financial difficulties for much of its existence; its hired men were sometimes paid half their wages, or less, or nothing. "Baxter kept a record of these deficits, which he considered as arrears, but could never recover them from the company." (Baxter may have received his share in 1623 as compensation for the arrearages.)

Baxter was with the King's Men in the years from 1628 to 1637; he appeared in their productions of Ford's The Lover's Melancholy (1628) and Massinger's Believe as You List (1631), and their revival of Fletcher's The Mad Lover, c. 1630.

With Baxter as with many other actors of his time, some of the best evidence on his career comes from legal documents. In March 1622, a feltmaker complained that Baxter had wounded him during a performance, while the feltmaker had been seated at the side of the stage. Apparently, nothing came of the man's complaint. In the following year, 1623, Baxter gave testimony in a legal suit, the so-called Baskervile or Worth/Baskerville suit, that involved most of the members of his acting troupe. (Baxter's signatures on legal documents, in 1623 and in 1665, prove that the pre-1642 and post-1660 actors are the same man.)

== Dark years ==
From 1642 to 1660, during the years of the Civil War and Commonwealth, the theatres were formally closed. Actors performed clandestinely when they could, though they were repeatedly harassed, arrested, imprisoned, and generally persecuted by the authorities. Legal documents once again throw light upon the careers of Baxter and his fellow actors in these years. Baxter was one of several English actors who performed on the Continent, mainly in The Hague and Paris, in the years 1644 and 1645.

He was also involved in a 1648 effort to restart the King's Men. In December of that year, Baxter and nine other actors, most of them veterans of the company, signed a contract with an upholsterer named Robert Conway; Conway was to provide financial backing for the group in return for a portion of their income, and the ten would be the sharers or partners in the new version of the old company. This effort produced limited drama but enduring litigation: Conway's heirs sued the actors in 1661, claiming that the 1648 contract granted them a share in the profits of the newly formed King's Company. In the complainants' interpretation, the King's Company was a continuation of the 1648 group, and Conway's contract applied. The resulting suit has been called "the Baxter suit," since in some documents Baxter is listed first among the involved actors. Baxter himself gave a deposition in the case in 1665, in which he identified himself as being 72 years old at the time.

The documents in the case specify that during the years of the theatre closure the actors often could act only in private homes for relatively small sums; and even then they were sometimes arrested and jailed. The authorities used confiscation of the actors' costumes as an effective means of suppression, since a troupe's stock of costumes constituted its main material wealth and financial investment.

== In the Restoration ==
Baxter was one of the thirteen actors who became sharers in the new King's Company when it was organized at the start of the Restoration period. He continued with that organization for the remainder of his stage career. His 1665 deposition indicated that he received a "salary," apparently more like a pension, of 20 shillings per week since 1663. He likely died not long prior to 8 February 1668, "when his name is cancelled in a livery warrant."

Baxter was probably the father of two actors of the next generation, John Baxter and another Richard Baxter.
