= Love Freed from Ignorance and Folly =

Play

Love Freed from Ignorance and Folly was a Jacobean era masque, written by Ben Jonson and designed by Inigo Jones, with music by Alfonso Ferrabosco. It was performed on 3 February 1611 at Whitehall Palace, and published in 1616.

Love Freed from Ignorance and Folly proved to be the last masque in which Anne of Denmark, King James I's Queen, performed.

== Background ==
During the previous six years, the English Court of King James I had established a pattern of staging a major (and expensive) masque in the Christmas season, often on Twelfth Night. James's queen, Anne of Denmark, was a prime mover is these entertainments, and repeatedly performed in them herself, as in the masques of Blackness (1605), Beauty (1608), and Queens (1609). 1611 saw a divergence from this pattern: the major masque of that season was Oberon, the Faery Prince, which starred Anne's and James's eldest son Henry Frederick, Prince of Wales. Anne got a masque of her own a month later, though it was a more modest affair than previous events; while the bills for earlier masques regularly ran into the thousands of pounds, the total for Love Freed from Ignorance and Folly was only £719.

The queen's masque Love Freed was originally scheduled for December 1610, and then for Twelfth Night, 6 January 1611. It was postponed twice because of delays in the arrival of the French ambassador, the Marshal de Laverdin, in the wake of the assassination of Henri IV. Martin Butler explains a misunderstanding that the performance was delayed a whole year, which was based on a misreading of a letter from the Venetian ambassador. Marc' Antonio Correr also suggested the delay was caused by problems with the stage machinery.

== The show ==
The masque featured a dozen primary masquers: Anne's ladies in waiting as Daughters of the Morn, with Anne herself as the Queen of the Orient. The anti-masque correspondingly featured twelve Follies or "she-fools." The masque begins with a long conversation between Cupid and a Sphinx; the conceit is that the Sphinx has captured "Love," who must in turn be liberated from this captivity – hence the title. (Cupid's nakedness was simulated with a flesh-colored satin costume.) Cupid is freed by the priests of the Muses, who clue the god to the correct answers to the Sphinx's riddles (which are "Britain" and "King James"). The Queen and Daughters of the Morn also must be released from the Sphinx's imprisonment. Once they are released they appear in a cloud in the sky above their former prison.

== Fees ==
Both Jonson and Jones received their standard fee of £40 for the masque, though a "dancing master" Nicholas Confesse who taught the ladies their choreography was paid £50, and his assistant Jacques Bochan got £20 for "teaching the ladies the footing of 2 dances". Ferrabosco received £20, and musical assistants Robert Johnson and Thomas Lupo earned £5 for arranging the songs for lutes and violins. The five boys who played the Sphinx, Cupid, and the Graces got £2 apiece, but the twelve actors (male) who played the she-fools got only £1 each.

== Publication ==
The text was published in the first folio collection of Jonson's works in 1616, and was reprinted in the second folio of 1640 and in subsequent Jonson collections.
