= Greene's Tu Quoque =

1611 play by John Cooke

Greene's Tu Quoque, also known as The City Gallant, is a Jacobean era stage play, a comedy written by John Cooke. The play was a major popular success upon its premier and became something of a legend in the theatre lore of the seventeenth century.

== Performance ==
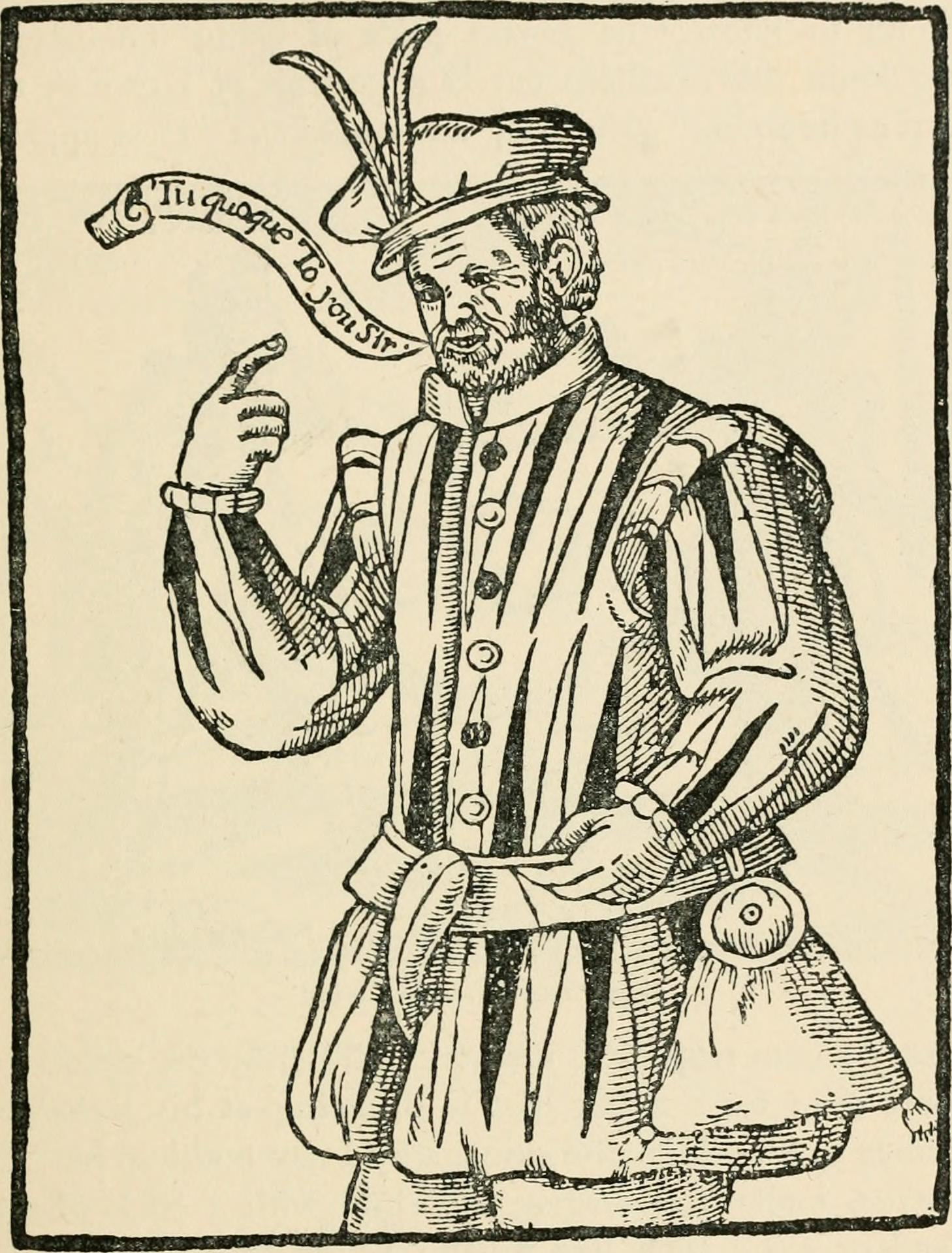

Cooke's play was performed by Queen Anne's Men at the Red Bull Theatre in 1611. The play satirises Coryat's Crudities, the travelogue by Thomas Coryat published in that year. The company's leading clown, Thomas Greene, played the role of Bubble in the play, and his rendering of Bubble's catch phrase "Tu quoque" (Latin for "you also" or, colloquially, "the same to you"), repeated through the play, captured the audience's fancy. The play was performed twice at Court, on 27 December 1611 and 2 February 1612 (Candlemas night), before King James I and Queen Anne; Greene, representing his troupe, received a payment of £20 for the two performances on 18 June 1612 (which shows how long the players sometimes waited for money from their royal patrons). By that date in the summer of 1612, Cooke's play had already lost its original title; the Court records refer to the work as Tu Coque.

Greene's Tu Quoque would likely have become a key item in the Queen's Men's repertory, except for the unfortunate death of Thomas Greene in August 1612. The play was revived by the Queen of Bohemia's Men and performed at Court on 6 January 1625 before Charles I. In the Restoration period, Sir William Davenant produced his own adaptation of Cooke's play in 1667; Samuel Pepys saw it on 12 September of that year. Davenant's version was not published in its own era, and no copy of it has survived. Francis Kirkman's 1662 volume The Wits uses a frontispiece that alludes to the play: a picture of a clown peeking out from behind a curtain is captioned "Tu quoque".

== Publication ==
The play was first published in a 1614 quarto issued by the bookseller John Trundle. (The play was published without an entry in the Stationers' Register, which was unusual though not unknown. Trundle – whose shop bore the sign of "the Nobody" – would publish A Fair Quarrel three years later, in 1617, also without a Register entry.) In this first edition, the work was called Greene's Tu Quoque, or The City Gallant; and it was under its ad hoc title that the play maintained its fame. The first edition bore a picture of Greene, in costume, on its title page. A second quarto was printed in 1622 for stationer Thomas Drew, and a third, undated quarto followed sometime later, perhaps by 1628.

== Playwright ==
Virtually nothing is known of the author. He is identified as "Io. Cooke" on the title page of the 1614 quarto, and for many years scholars were not even sure if his name was John or Joshua. The first quarto bears an Epistle to the Reader by Thomas Heywood, which indicates that Cooke was dead by 1614.

John Payne Collier speculated that John Cooke was a brother of Alexander Cooke, actor with the King's Men.

== Plot ==
Cooke's play can be classed with other prodigal-son plays of its era, like Eastward Ho and The Roaring Girl. It tells a double version of the story: the citizen Spendall, as his name indicates, wastes his patrimony and is reduced to poverty and prison. Bubble enjoys the reverse fortune, coming into money – yet he remains true to his master, the gentlemanly Staines, mourning the man's decline and urging him to repair his fortunes...by robbery ("if we be taken, we'll hang together at Tyburn"). The high-living Staines loses his estate to a usurer in a foreclosed debt; the usurer dies and passes his wealth to his nephew...Bubble. In a reversal of roles, Staines becomes Bubble's servant. Staines gets his revenge by making Bubble a pretentious fool, worse than the natural fool he already was. Through a series of disguises and cheats, Staines eventually manages to reverse his situation, till he is the master and Bubble the servant once again.

Greene's Tu Quoque gives a rich picture of everyday life in its era; it "uses tennis rackets, tobacco pipes, cards, dice and candles to establish a life of debauchery in visual terms...and a begging-basket with scraps of food to symbolize the natural result...." The play's stark picture of debtors' prison is noteworthy. The drama is lavish in its use of costume and the details of the mercer's trade in the London of its time.

== Metafiction ==
The play's text contains a bit of meta-theater, in that Greene in the role of Bubble refers to himself during performance:

Geraldine: Why, then, we'll go to the Red Bull: they say Greene's a good clown.
Bubble: Greene! Greene's an ass.
Scattergood: Wherefore do you say so?
Bubble: Indeed I ha' no reason; for they say he is as like me as ever he can look.

Ben Jonson would work the same trick in 1616 in his The Devil is an Ass, by referring in his text to actor Richard Robinson, who starred in the original production. And Thomas Killigrew would give his version of the trick in The Parson's Wedding (1641).

== Greene ==
Thomas Greene was born in Romford, Essex, in September 1573; his baptism is recorded as 13 September 1573. He was with the Queen's Men from 1604 (shortly after the death of the company's celebrated comedian Will Kempe) and his usual stage persona was that of "amiable ass". By the time of his death in August 1612 he had risen to be a principal investor in the company, as well as the leaseholder of the nearby Curtain Theatre. One cryptic epigram states that "new come from sea, [he] made but one face and died"; this, states William Oldys, appeared in Richard Braithwaite's Remains after Death (1618) and signifies that he had recently returned from overseas and specialized in but one type of role. He once played a baboon onstage. His 1612 last will and testament mentions his wife Susan, daughter Honor, brothers John and Jeffrey Greene and sister Elizabeth Barrett. The will also mentions two sons-in-law and three daughters-in-law, though in Greene's day these terms referred to stepchildren – his wife Susan's five children with her first husband, Robert Browne.

(Greene's will, dated 25 July 1612, left his share in the company to his wife. She later remarried, and as Susan Baskervile initiated the lawsuit that would end the existence of Queen Anne's Men.)

== Sources ==
- Chambers, E. K. The Elizabethan Stage. 4 Volumes, Oxford, Clarendon Press, 1923.
- Howard, Jean Elizabeth. Theatre of a City: The Places of London Comedy, 1598–1642. Philadelphia, University of Pennsylvania Press, 2006.
- Leggatt, Alexander. Jacobean Public Theatre. London, Routledge, 1992.
- Leinwand, Theodore B. Theatre, Finance, and Society in Early Modern England. Cambridge, Cambridge University Press, 1999.
- MacIntyre, Jean. Costumes and Scripts in the Elizabethan Theatres. Edmonton, AB, University of Alberta Press, 1992.
