= William Beeston =

British actor and director (1606–1682)

William Beeston (1606? – 1682) was an English actor and theatre manager, the son and successor to the more famous Christopher Beeston.

== Early phase ==
William was brought up in the theatrical world of his father; he became an actor, and also his father's assistant in managing the Cockpit and Red Bull theatres and their associated companies of actors, including the company of younger players colloquially known as Beeston's Boys.

Upon his father's death in 1638, William Beeston inherited their theatrical enterprise – though he managed it with much less success than his father had. On 5 May 1640 he was thrown into the Marshalsea Prison for a Beeston's Boys' play, acted the day before, that gave offence to Sir Henry Herbert, the Master of the Revels. The play was most likely The Court Beggar by Richard Brome, which satirized several members of Queen Henrietta Maria's circle of favourites, including Sir John Suckling and Sir William Davenant (though Brome's The Queen and Concubine has also been suggested as the offending play). Control of Beeston's theatres and actors was given to Davenant (in a royal warrant dated 27 June 1640). Davenant, though, was busy with other matters – politics and the coming revolution; Beeston was able to resume his position, sometime in the latter part of 1641 (only to face the closing of the theatres the next year, at the outbreak of the English Civil War).

Perhaps because of such difficulties, or his responses to them, William Beeston gained a reputation (justly or not) for unscrupulousness and shady dealing. His use of the alias "Hutchinson" is verified by several sources. (His father had used the Hutchinson name too; perhaps Hutchinson was the original family name, and Beeston a pseudonym, a stage name.) The records of St. Giles in the Fields, the London parish where the Cockpit was located, record Beeston's marriages, one under the "Hutchinson" name. Beeston married Margaret Howson on 28 October 1633; "William Hutchinson alias Beeston" married Alice Bowen on 15 July 1642. The parish records also note the christenings and burials of eight Beeston infants from 1637 to 1647.

== Interregnum ==
During the Interregnum, Beeston tried to re-establish the Beeston's Boys troupe, despite the official prohibition on theatrical activity. In 1650 he paid £200 for repairs to the Cockpit Theatre and then gathered a group of "prentices and covenant servants to instruct them in the quality of acting and fitting for the stage," as he would testify in a lawsuit a year later. His attempt was not successful, largely due to the continued opposition to professional theatre by the Puritan authorities. Beeston was persistent, however; he gained title to the remains of the Salisbury Court Theatre in 1652, and rebuilt it in April 1660; the theatre returned to service when dramatic performances resumed at the start of the Restoration. William Beeston was able to re-form Beeston's Boys for a time; he received a warrant from Sir Henry Herbert, the Master of the Revels, and his troupe played in the summer of 1660. It did not last, though, and many of its members were absorbed into George Jolly's new company. Thereafter, Beeston himself resumed acting.

(Regarding Beeston's shady reputation, see the 1653 suppressed performance of Thomas Killigrew's Claricilla.)

Francis Kirkman dedicated his translation of The Loves and Adventures of Clerio and Lozia to Beeston in 1652. In the dedication, Kirkman praises Beeston's "instruction, judgment, and fancy" and calls him "the happiest interpreter & judge of our English stage plays...." Of course, Kirkman, just starting his career, wanted things from Beeston – he nominates Beeston "for my patron & protector" — and so his praise may be suspect; though his choice of Beeston as a potential patron is curious, at the least.

== Later years ==
Beeston was able to organise a new version of Beeston's Boys at the start of the Restoration era; but the company lasted only for a few years; it was squeezed out of existence by the reigning "duopoly" of the King's Company and Duke's Company.

As for William Beeston's legacy: he may have been the first manager in the public theatre of his era to use scenery. He was also a source of information for the antiquarian and biographer John Aubrey. William Beeston was Aubrey's source on Shakespeare, and so helped to pass on traditions about the poet that were current in the theatrical world of his generation – i.e. that Shakespeare "understood Latin pretty well: for he had been in his younger years a schoolmaster in the country", etc.
