= Robert Browne (Elizabethan actor) =

Robert Browne (died October 1603) was an English actor of the Elizabethan era, and the owner and manager of the Boar's Head Theatre. He is also part of an enduring confusion in the study of English Renaissance theatre.

== Two Robert Brownes ==
The relevant documents of English Renaissance drama contain numerous references to "Robert Browne." Early twentieth-century scholars, like E. K. Chambers and Edwin Nunzeger, assumed that these records referred to a single individual. Later scholars, principally Charles Jasper Sisson and Herbert Berry, argued persuasively that two separate individuals had been confused and conflated into one. Or two at least: "There were obviously at least two and could easily have been three or more Robert Brownes who had to do with the companies and playhouses of the time."

To distinguish between two Robert Brownes, the earliest years of the seventeenth century are key. One Robert Browne was busy running the Boar's Head Theatre in 1601 through 1603; another Robert Browne was performing with English actors in Germany between 1601 and 1607. The Boar's Head Browne died in 1603, and so can reasonably be termed an Elizabethan actor. The career of the "other" Robert Browne extended through the first two decades of the seventeenth century; he can sensibly be called a Jacobean actor.

== The Elizabethan actor ==
The Robert Browne who is the subject of this article was the man who ran the Boar's Head Theatre, and who was married to Susan Browne (later Susan Greene, later Susan Baskervile) and the father of their five children, including the actor William Browne (1602–34). Browne of the Boar's Head was in all likelihood the Browne who was a leader among the acting troupe Derby's Men, and who received payments for Court performances by Derby's Men in 1600 and 1601.

A Robert Browne wrote to Edward Alleyn in 1589; when the subject of this article died in October 1603, Joan Alleyn wrote the news to her husband. The later Robert Browne wrote to Alleyn in 1612, showing that the Alleyns knew both men. Concerning Edward Alleyn and the two Brownes, one scholar has written, "From the scanty record it would appear that the first was of particular interest to Alleyn but not on good terms, while the second appears, from occasional notes to Alleyn, to have been confident and respectful."

It is not impossible that there was a family relationship between the two Brownes, since familial connections were common among actors and theatre people in the era: consider John and Lawrence Dutton in Queen Elizabeth's Men, Anthony and Humphrey Jeffes in the Admiral's Men a generation later, plus Robert Pallant father and son (apparently), and other such pairs. To compound the confusion, both Robert Brownes had sons named Robert Browne.
