= Holland's Leaguer (brothel) =

17th century London brothel

Coordinates: 51.50674°N 0.10091°W

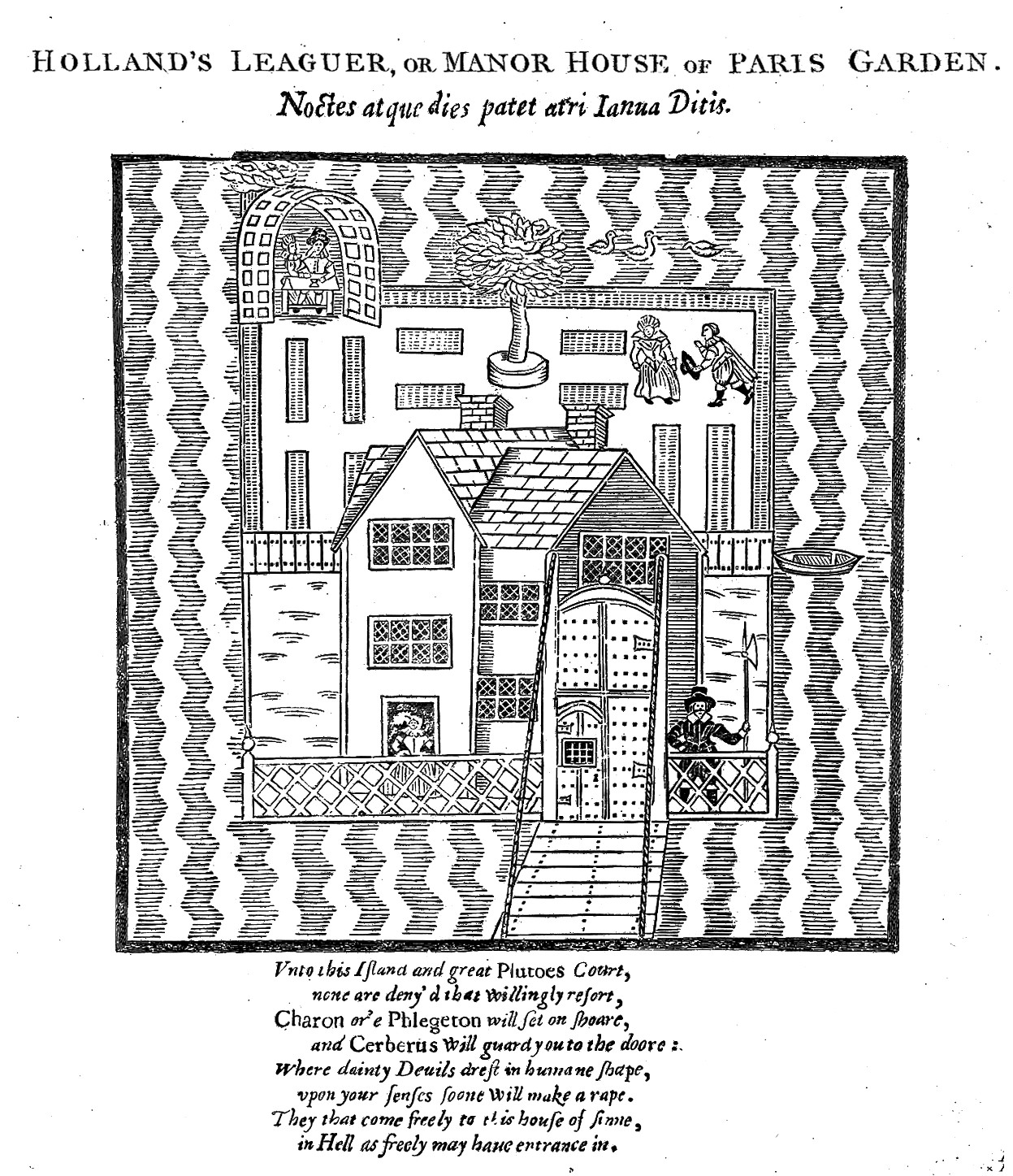
Holland's Leaguer or Manor House of Paris Garden

Holland's Leaguer was the name of a Dutch English brothel in London between 1603 and January 1632. It has been referred to as the most famed brothel in 17th-century England. "Legeur" means military encampment.

It was an expensive establishment with King James I of England and George Villiers, 1st Duke of Buckingham, allegedly among its clients, though this stems from later sources. The brothel was owned and managed by Elizabeth "Bess" Holland. She may have been married to one of the Holland family, notorious figures in the Elizabethan underworld. Popular rumour linked the house specifically with Dutch prostitutes. The brothel modelled itself on the Schoen Majken (The Lovely Little Maiden) in Brussels. It provided luxurious surroundings, good food, clean linen and 'modern' plumbing.

== Location ==
Holland's Leaguer was located in a former manor house in Old Paris Garden, Southwark, by the Thames. Located in Bankside, part of the Liberty of the Clink it was beyond the control of the London civil authorities. The manor house, once owned by the Knights Templar, was leased to Holland by Lord Hunsden in 1603. It was surrounded by a moat and had a drawbridge and portcullis. Although Henry VIII had suppressed the Bankside whorehouses in the 1540s, this was only a temporary measure.

== London apprentices ==
The brothel was a topical subject in 1631, because it had been attacked and damaged during the annual Shrove Tuesday tumult by the London apprentices. Shrove Tuesday (the day before Ash Wednesday) was the 'prentices' holiday, and they often celebrated by running wild and causing destruction. (The Cockpit Theatre was damaged in their Shrove Tuesday rioting on 4 March 1617.) Brothels were a regular target of the 'prentices.

== Closure ==
In December 1631, Charles I of England gave order of its closure and sent soldiers there to perform the order. Bess Holland raised the bridge over the moat, causing the soldiers to fall in the water, after which the brothel workers emptied their pots over them. The brothel was besieged for a month until it was finally closed in January 1632. Holland fled and opened another brothel elsewhere.

== In contemporary media ==
The siege of Holland's Leaguer was portrayed in the pamphlet Holland's Leaguer by Nicholas Goodman, the play Holland's Leaguer by Shackerley Marmion, and the ballad "News from Holland's Leaguer" by Lawrence Price. It is also mentioned in the song "The Jolly Broom Man" by Richard Crimsal where an ex-soldier lists his many achievements in battle but concludes that his service at the Leaguer "proved too hot".

== Bibliography ==
- Fumerton, Patricia; Guerrini, Anita; McAbee, Kris, eds. (2010). Ballads and Broadsides in Britain, 1500-1800. Ashgate Publishing, Ltd. ISBN 9780754662488.
- Goodman, Nicholas (2015). Hollands leaguer: A critical Edition. Walter de Gruyter GmbH & Co KG. ISBN 9783111588254.
- Higgins, Siobhán (2017). Britain's Bourse: cultural and literary exchanges between England and the Low Countries in the early modern era (c. 1580-1620) (PDF). Cork Open research Archive (PhD Thesis). University College Cork.
- Howard, Jean Elizabeth (2007). Theater of a City: The Places of London Comedy, 1598-1642. University of Pennsylvania Press. ISBN 9780812239782.
- Kaler, Anne K. (1991). The Picara: From Hera to Fantasy Heroine. Popular Press. ISBN 9780879725167.
- Pepys, Samuel; Rollins, Hyder Edward, eds. (1922). A Pepysian Garland: Black-letter Broadside Ballads of the Years 1595-1639, Chiefly from the Collection of Samuel Pepys. CUP Archive. p. 399. "Holland's Leaguer brothel apprentices."
- Price, Victoria E (2006). "Holland's Leaguer". In Ditmore, Melissa Hope (ed.). Encyclopedia of Prostitution and Sex Work. Greenwood Publishing Group. ISBN 9780313329685.
- Rees, Sian (2012). Moll: The Life and Times of Moll Flanders. Pimlico. ISBN 9781845951931.
- St Nicholas, Thomas (2002). At Vacant Hours. A&C Black. ISBN 9781902459325.
- Walford, Edward (1878). "Southwark: Winchester House and Barclay's Brewery". Old and New London: Volume 6. London: British History Online. pp. 29–44.
- Williams, Gordon (2001). A Dictionary of Sexual Language and Imagery in Shakespearean and Stuart Literature: Three Volume Set Volume I A-F Volume II G-P Volume III Q-Z. A&C Black. ISBN 9780485113938.
