= C. J. Sisson =

British academic

Charles Jasper Sisson (15 December 1885 – 28 July 1966) was a British academic and writer. From 1928 until 1951 he was Lord Northcliffe professor of modern English literature at University College London.

== Early life and career ==
He was born in County Durham and educated at Rutherford College and Edinburgh University.

In 1907 he was awarded a Heriot Fellowship at Edinburgh and appointed lecturer in English literature at the University of Dijon. In 1909 Sisson moved to the Cairo University and from 1910 until 1921 he worked for Elphinstone College in Bombay. He served as principal of Karnatak College, Bombay, in 1922 and principal of Elphinstone College in 1923.

From 1923 until 1928 Sisson served as reader in English literature at University College London. In 1928 he became Lord Northcliffe professor of modern English literature at UCL, which he held until 1951.

In 1938 he held the Sandars Readership in Bibliography at Cambridge University lecturing on "The judicious marriage of Mr Hooker and the birth of ‘the Laws of Ecclesiastical Polity’."

He then served as senior fellow and assistant director of the Shakespeare Institute at the University of Birmingham. From 1927 until 1955 he was editor of The Modern Language Review.

== Writings ==
In Who's Who Sisson listed amongst his recreations the "Record Office and detective stories", and his works on Thomas Lodge and Other Elizabethans (1933) and the Lost Plays of Shakespeare's Age (1936) were the fruits of his detailed knowledge of archival sources. He edited Philip Massinger's Believe as You List for the Malone Society, which was published in 1928. Sisson also edited the complete works of Shakespeare and wrote a companion volume, New Readings in Shakespeare (1954). His 1960 work Shakespeare's Tragic Justice analysed Macbeth, Othello, Hamlet and King Lear.

== Personal life ==
In 1916 Sisson married Vera Kathleen Ginn and they had two daughters. one of whom was Rosemary Anne Sisson

== Works ==
- Le Goût Public et le Théâtre Elisebéthain (Dijon: Université de Dijon, 1922).
- Shakespeare in India (London: Published for the Shakespeare Association by Humphrey Milford, Oxford University Press, 1926).
- The Elizabethan Dramatists except Shakespeare (London: Ernest Benn Limited, 1928).
- Thomas Lodge and Other Elizabethans (Cambridge, Massachusetts: Harvard University Press, 1933).
- The Mythical Sorrows of Shakespeare (London: Milford, 1934).
- Lost Plays of Shakespeare's Age (Cambridge: Cambridge University Press, 1936).
- The Judicious Marriage of Mr. Hooker and the Birth of The Laws of Ecclesiastical Polity (Cambridge: Cambridge University Press, 1940).
- William Shakespeare: Complete Works (London: Odhams Press, 1954).
- Shakespeare (London: Published for the National Book League by the Cambridge University Press, 1954).
- New Readings in Shakespeare, 2 vols. (Cambridge: Cambridge University Press, 1956).
- Shakespeare's Tragic Justice (London: Methuen, 1960).
- The Boar's Head Theatre: An Inn-Yard Theatre of the Elizabethan Age, ed. Stanley Wells (London: Routledge & Kegan Paul, 1972). ISBN 071007252X
