= Salisbury Court Theatre =

Theatre in London

Coordinates: 51°30′47.9″N 0°6′22.4″W

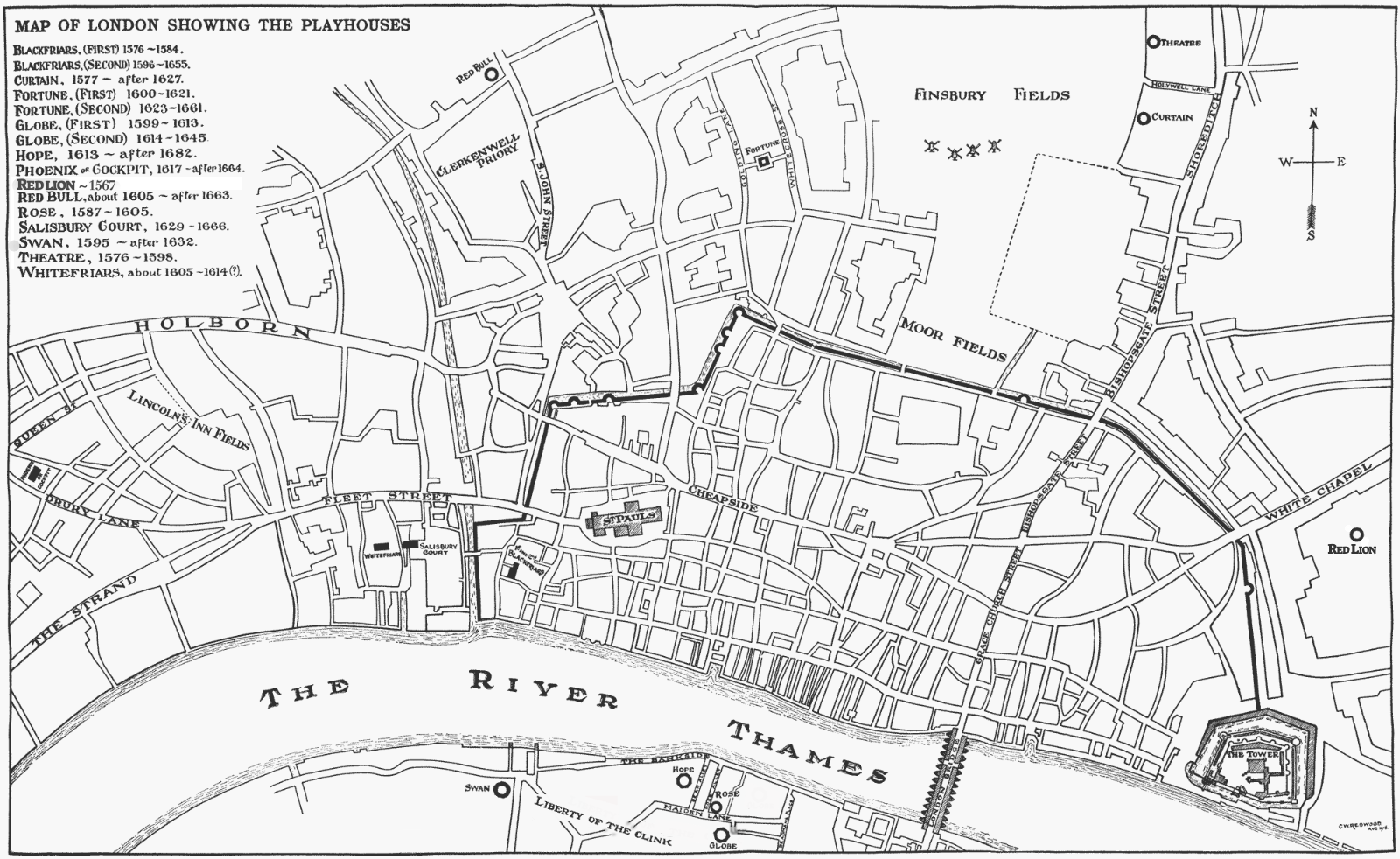
The Salisbury Court Theatre is shown to the west of St Paul's Cathedral in this London street map.

The Salisbury Court Theatre was a theatre in 17th-century London. It was in the neighbourhood of Salisbury Court, which was formerly the London residence of the Bishops of Salisbury. Salisbury Court was acquired by Richard Sackville in 1564 during the last seven years of his life when he was Chancellor of the Exchequer under Queen Elizabeth; when Thomas Sackville was created Earl of Dorset in 1604, the building was renamed Dorset House. (His grandson, Edward Sackville, 4th Earl of Dorset, was Queen Henrietta Maria's Lord Chamberlain in the 1630s, and was a prime mover in theatre and drama in London in that era, including the force behind the founding of this theatre.)

According to contemporary chronicler Edmund Howes, "a new faire Play-house" was erected in 1629, just to the west of the medieval walls of the City of London, between Fleet Street and the River Thames, in a building converted from a barn or granary in the grounds of Dorset House. An enclosed "private" venue like the Blackfriars Theatre, it was a successor to the earlier Whitefriars Theatre (which had been just on the other side of Water Lane) and the short-lived Porter's Hall Theatre, and catered to an upscale and elite audience—in contrast to the open-air theatres like the Globe, Fortune, and Red Bull theatres that served a mass audience (especially in the latter two cases).

Little is known about the actual form and shape of the Salisbury Court Theatre. Yet since it was on a plot of land 42 feet (13 meters) wide, it may have resembled, to some greater or lesser degree, the plan for a small theatre drawn by Inigo Jones in the later Jacobean or Caroline era, which adheres to a very similar scale.

The Salisbury Court was built at a cost of £1,000 by Richard Gunnell, a veteran actor and the manager of the Fortune, and William Blagrave, deputy to Sir Henry Herbert, Master of the Revels. At some point in the middle of the 1630s, control of the theatre passed to the "dictatorial management" of Richard Heton, who was in charge by October 1635. (Gunnell died in late 1634 or early 1635, while Blagrave would die in 1636.) During the 1630s, the theatre was occupied at various times by the King's Revels Men (1630–31 and 1633–36), by Prince Charles's Men (1631–33), and by Queen Henrietta's Men (1637–42); for a time it was a major locus of dramatic activity, a main rival to the theatrical establishment run by Christopher Beeston at the Cockpit and Red Bull theatres. [See: Richard Brome.]

Salisbury Court was the last theatre to be built before the closing of the theatres in 1642, during the Puritan era. After the theatres were closed, Salisbury Court was sometimes used for other purposes – and sometimes, as through much of 1647, it was used for theatrical performances in contravention of the local authorities. (The players played when they could get away with doing so—which was not always: the London authorities raided the Salisbury Court on 6 October 1647, breaking up a performance of A King and No King by Beaumont and Fletcher.) On 1 January 1649, the London authorities raided all four of the London theatres simultaneously; the actors at the Salisbury Court Theatre and the Cockpit Theatre were arrested, as was a "rope-dancer" or trapeze artist performing at the Fortune Theatre—but the actors at the Red Bull Theatre managed to escape. In March 1649, the authorities destroyed the interior of the Salisbury Court theatre, and the Fortune and the Cockpit too, making them useless for public performances.

After years of being banned in the Interregnum, theatre was again permitted on the Restoration of Charles II in 1660, with the grant of two Letters patent to two companies to perform "legitimate drama" in London. The Salisbury Court Theatre was refurbished by William Beeston and used for a time by the Duke's Company, patronised by the Duke of York (later James II), from November 1660 to June 1661, when they moved to the nearby Lisle's Tennis Court next to Lincoln's Inn Fields, which they found a better venue. George Jolly's troupe also played there for a time. Samuel Pepys records visiting it several times in his diary for early 1661 (often calling it the Whitefriars Theatre).

Pepys' famous Diary provides information on the plays acted at the Salisbury Court Theatre immediately after the theatres re-opened. He saw Fletcher's The Mad Lover on 9 February 1661; Middleton and Rowley's The Changeling on 23 February (Thomas Betterton played De Flores); Massinger's The Bondman on 1 March (Betterton again); Fletcher and Massinger's The Spanish Curate on 16 March; Heywood's Love's Mistress on 2 March; and Fletcher's Rule a Wife and Have a Wife on 1 April. (All dates new style.)

The building burned down in the Great Fire of London in 1666. It was replaced in 1671 by the Dorset Garden Theatre, which was built slightly further south to a design by Christopher Wren. The theatre is commemorated by a plaque on the Dorset Rise (east) side of the corporate building on the south side of Salisbury Square.

== See also ==
- List of English Renaissance theatres
