= Prince Charles's Men =

Prince Charles's Men (known as the Duke of York's Men from 1608 to 1612) was a playing company or troupe of actors in Jacobean and Caroline England.

== The Jacobean era troupe ==
The company was formed in 1608 as the Duke of York's Men, under the titular patronage of King James' second son, the eight-year-old Charles (1600–49), then the Duke of York. Upon the death of Charles's elder brother Prince Henry in 1612, the company became Prince Charles's Men. They played mainly in the provinces for the first two years of their existence, but in 1610 they received a renewed royal patent that authorized them to play in London, "in such usual houses as themselves shall provide."

Seven actors are listed in the patent: John Garland, William Rowley, Thomas Hobbes, Robert Dawes, Joseph Taylor, John Newton, and Gilbert Reason. Rowley was their dramatist and clown; Joseph Taylor would be their leading man in future years, and then fill the same function with the King's Men, when he replaced the late Richard Burbage in May 1619. Garland was a veteran, having been a founding member of Queen Elizabeth's Men in 1583. Hobbes had a comparably long career ahead of him: he would be with the King's Men as late as 1637. Newton and Reason continued with the company until its end in 1625.

For a short time around 1614–15, they joined forces with the Lady Elizabeth's Men at Philip Henslowe's recently built Hope Theatre, but separated again in 1616 when the Lady Elizabeth's company left London to tour the provinces. Taylor transferred to the King's Men in 1619; in the same year, Prince Charles's Men left Henslowe's Hope (a less-than-ideal venue for drama, since it doubled as a bear-baiting ring) and moved into Christopher Beeston's Cockpit Theatre, and were thereafter closely associated with Beeston's theatrical enterprise. They acted at the Cockpit from 1619 till 1622, and after that, at Beeston's Red Bull Theatre.

When their patron became King Charles I in 1625, the King chose to renew his father's patronage of the King's Men, the company of Shakespeare and Burbage that had maintained its reputation as the best in drama. Prince Charles's Men disbanded, at least officially; some of the troupe's members may have continued with the so-called Red Bull company that occupied that theatre from 1625 on. Little is known about them.

== The Caroline era troupe ==
In the confused theatre scene of the Caroline era – what Andrew Gurr has called "a complex game of musical playhouses" in which companies switched theatres and changed their names – there was a troupe that acted under the name in the 1631–42 period, with royal patronage under the name of the infant Prince Charles, the future Charles II; scholars sometimes designate it Prince Charles's Men (II). This company, which included some personnel from the Admiral's/Palsgrave's company that had collapsed in 1631, was at Richard Gunnell's new Salisbury Court Theatre in the 1631–33 era, at the Red Bull Theatre in 1634–40, and at the Fortune Theatre in 1640–42. The original 1631 sharers in this company were Andrew Cane (their star clown), Ellis Worth, Joseph Moore, Matthew Smith, Richard Fowler, William Brown, James Sneller (or Kneller), Thomas Bond, Henry Gradwell, and William Hall. The same men (except for Moore, who may have been a manager rather than an actor) were named Grooms of the Chamber on 10 May 1632.

This second version of the company had a tempestuous existence, with small audiences and poor returns, lawsuits and controversies. The troupe lost almost half its sharers in the 1634–36 period alone, due to death or desertion. The company did perform 14 times at Court in the five years from 1631 through 1635 (compare 86 Court performances by the King's Men, and 62 by Queen Henrietta's Men, in the same years). The Prince's troupe left the Salisbury Court Theatre during the disruptions of the bubonic plague epidemic of 1636–37, and finished its career at the Red Bull Theatre.

Even after the London theatres closed in September 1642 at the start of the English Civil War, a remnant of the company seems to have struggled on. William Hall and a few more, apparently joined by other displaced English actors, performed in The Hague and Paris in 1644 and 1645.
