= Queen Anne's Men =

17th-century English acting troupe

Queen Anne's Men was a playing company, or troupe of actors, in Jacobean-era London. In their own era they were known colloquially as the Queen's Men — as were Queen Elizabeth's Men and Queen Henrietta's Men, in theirs.

== Formation ==
The group was formed on the accession of James I in 1603, and named after its patron, James's wife Anne of Denmark. It was a combination of two previously-existing companies, Oxford's Men and Worcester's Men. Among the company's most important members were Christopher Beeston, its manager, and Thomas Heywood, the actor-dramatist who wrote many of its plays, including The Rape of Lucrece (printed 1608) and The Golden Age (printed 1611). William Kempe finished his career with this company, though he died c. 1603.

== Personnel ==
In 1604, ten members of the new-formed company were granted the sum of four and a half pounds each, to buy red cloth for their livery for 15 March coronation procession. The ten were Beeston, Heywood, Richard Perkins, Thomas Greene, John Duke, James Holt, Robert Beeston, Robert Lee, Robert Pallant, and Thomas Swinerton. The same ten men are listed in a license granted to the company in 1609 (though Pallant is misnamed "Richard").

Richard Perkins would develop into the company's leading actor, and acquire a reputation as a major tragedian. John Duke had come to Worcester's from the Lord Chamberlain's Men, along with Christopher Beeston, in 1602. Little is known of Robert Beeston, though the common name suggests he was a relative of Christopher. (Pairs of relatives were not uncommon in acting troupes in this era: the brothers John and Laurence Dutton in Oxford's Men and Queen Elizabeth's Men in the 1580s; Anthony and Humphrey Jeffes in the Admiral's/Prince Henry's Men in the early 17th century. Robert Pallant, the son of the man in Queen Anne's, would play female roles for the King's Men c. 1620.)

Thomas Greene was the company's major comedian; he was reputed to have once portrayed a baboon onstage. Greene was so closely identified with his role as Bubble in a 1611 play that the play became indelibly renamed Greene's Tu Quoque.

A host of other actors were in the company over its tenure. See Richard Baxter and William Robbins for examples.

== Theatres and performances ==
Queen Anne's Men originally performed at the Curtain Theatre — they acted The Travels of the Three English Brothers, by William Rowley, John Day, and George Wilkins, there in 1607; but they also acted the same play at the Red Bull Theatre in Clerkenwell that same year, becoming the first company to play there. John Webster's tragedy The White Devil received a disastrous premiere at the Red Bull on an overcast winter day in 1612.

Despite their royal patronage, Queen Anne's Men appear to have performed only sporadically at Court in their first decade – something less than once a year on average. On 12 and 13 January 1612, the company joined with the King's Men for Court performances of two Queen's company's plays, The Silver Age and The Rape of Lucrece. Queen Anne's Men played twice more at Court in the winter of 1613–14, three times in the following winter, and four times in 1615–16. They toured widely every summer throughout this period.

== Style ==
The company acquired a reputation for playing relatively unsophisticated drama for a rowdy audience. [For more on their theatre and its audience, see: Swetnam the Woman-Hater.] Yet their style of drama had some surprising aspects. They were creative in terms of special effects: consider these stage directions from Heywood's The Silver Age, written for and acted by the company —

- "Enter Pluto with a club of fire, a burning crown...and a guard of devils, all with burning weapons"
- "Jupiter appears in his glory under a rainbow"
- "Thunder, lightnings, Jupiter descends in his majesty, his thunderbolt burning"
- "...fireworks all over the house."

== Later years ==
In 1617 the company moved to the Cockpit Theatre, in the increasingly fashionable Drury Lane. This final move, which brought significantly higher admission prices, engendered indignation among their audience: the Cockpit was set on fire during a Shrove Tuesday riot on 4 March 1617 and had to be rebuilt. The Queen's troupe seems to have remained at the Cockpit for only a relatively brief time; within a couple of years they were back at the Red Bull.

The actors lost their patron at the death of Queen Anne in 1619; they continued on as the Company of the Revels, often known simply as the Red Bull Company after their theatre. Their final years were marked by a major legal dispute: Thomas Greene's widow, remarried as Susan Baskervile, sued for moneys owed her through her late husband's share in the troupe and loans she had extended over the years. The outcome of the so-called Baskerville or Worth/Baskerville suit was that the actors lost and the company was forced to dissolve in 1623.

Some members moved on to other troupes; Richard Perkins, for example, would acquire a reputation as perhaps the major tragedian of his generation while acting with Queen Henrietta's Men from 1625 to 1642. Christopher Beeston would attain prominence as the dominant theatre manager and impresario of the 1620s and 1630s.
