= Christopher Beeston =

English actor (1579–1638)

Christopher Beeston (c. 1579 – c. 15 October 1638) was a successful actor and a powerful theatrical impresario in early 17th century London. He was associated with a number of playwrights, particularly Thomas Heywood.

== Early life ==
Little is known of Beeston's early life. In extant records he is known alternately as Beeston and Hutchison. He has not so far been decisively connected with the William Beeston mentioned by Thomas Nashe in Strange News; however, such a connection is possible. Beeston has been conjecturally associated with the "Kit" in the surviving plot of Richard Tarlton's The Seven Deadly Sins. It is likely that he began in theatre as a child actor: Augustine Phillips bequeathed "his servant" Beeston thirty shillings in his 1605 last will and testament, indicating that Beeston had been that actor's apprentice with the Lord Chamberlain's Men. Beeston played in the company's 1598 production of Ben Jonson's Every Man in His Humour. So it appears that Beeston started as a boy player and later graduated to adult roles.

In 1602 Beeston was involved in a serious scandal involving a charge of rape. The evidence is recorded in the Minute Books of Bridewell prison. A woman named Margaret White, the widow of a cloth worker, accused him of raping her on Midsummer night and leaving her pregnant. Beeston denied the charge, in a riotous hearing attended by his fellow actors who "much abused the place". The hearing recommended that Beeston be prosecuted, but no records of a trial survive; it appears that the case did not follow through, perhaps for lack of evidence.

== Maturity ==
Beeston left the Lord Chamberlain's Men and moved on to Worcester's Men in August 1602, a month after the rape accusation; perhaps he was forced out. He stayed with Worcester's Men through its transformation into Queen Anne's Men, eventually becoming the troupe's manager. In this capacity, he worked closely with Thomas Heywood, producing most of that prolific writer's plays at the Red Bull Theatre. Surviving court documents suggest that Beeston's business practices were not above reproach; he was sued twice, in 1619 and 1623, in business disputes. The documentary records reveal that Beeston had treated company funds as his own, charging the company for properties he had purchased with its money. The company, already in difficult straits, limped along until the death of Queen Anne in 1619. For a brief time, the remnants of the company toured the countryside, but they soon disappeared.

Beeston, meantime, had established the Cockpit Theatre in Drury Lane. Beeston's interest in this theatre dates to 1616, when he bought a cockfight ring, possibly employing Inigo Jones to convert it to a theatre. The new establishment, still called the Cockpit Theatre after its former function, opened in 1616. On Shrove Tuesday 1617, a mob of apprentices ransacked and torched the theatre; patrons of the Red Bull, they appear to have been angry that their favourite plays had been moved to the more-exclusive (and expensive) indoor theatre. When Beeston rebuilt the theatre, he named it the Phoenix, but it was still frequently called the Cockpit.

Prospering in the theatre business meant negotiating murky waters. Beeston regularly bribed Sir Henry Herbert, the Master of the Revels, and once bought the Master's wife a pair of gloves worth "at least 20 shillings," according to Herbert's approving note. Beeston eventually granted Herbert a share in the profits of Queen Anne's Men.

== Later life ==
From 1619 until his death in 1638, Beeston ran both theatres with a succession of companies, ranging from Prince Charles' Men and Queen Henrietta's Men to the last group of child actors, commonly called Beeston's Boys. (The actors in this group were significantly older than Elizabethan boy players; a number were in their early twenties.) Beeston's enterprises during these years prospered. The Cockpit offered credible competition to the King's Men at the Blackfriars Theatre for the wealthier set of playgoers; Beeston employed fashionable playwrights such as John Ford and James Shirley to attract these audiences. After the temporary demise and ultimate eclipse of the Fortune Theatre in 1621, the Red Bull was the main attraction in Middlesex for citizens and apprentices.

Beeston died in 1638, leaving his theatrical interests in the hands of his son William Beeston.
