= Fortune Playhouse =

Theatre in Elizabethan London

Coordinates: 51°31′22″N 0°5′38″W

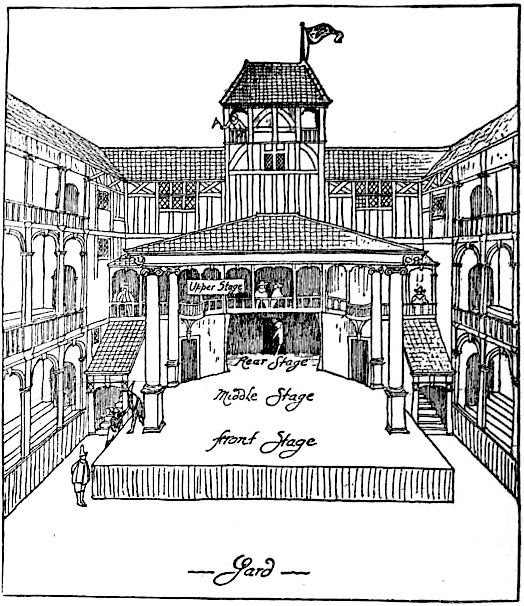
- Reconstruction of the theatre, drawn by Walter Godfrey in 1911 based on the builder's contract
- Interactive map of Fortune Playhouse
- Location: Golding Lane (now Golden Lane), London
- Capacity: 2340

Construction
- Opened: 1600
- Closed: 1661
- Architect: Peter Street

The Fortune Playhouse was an historic theatre in London. It was located between Whitecross Street and the modern Golden Lane, just outside the City of London. It was founded about 1600, and suppressed by the Puritan Parliament in 1642.

== History ==
=== Origins ===
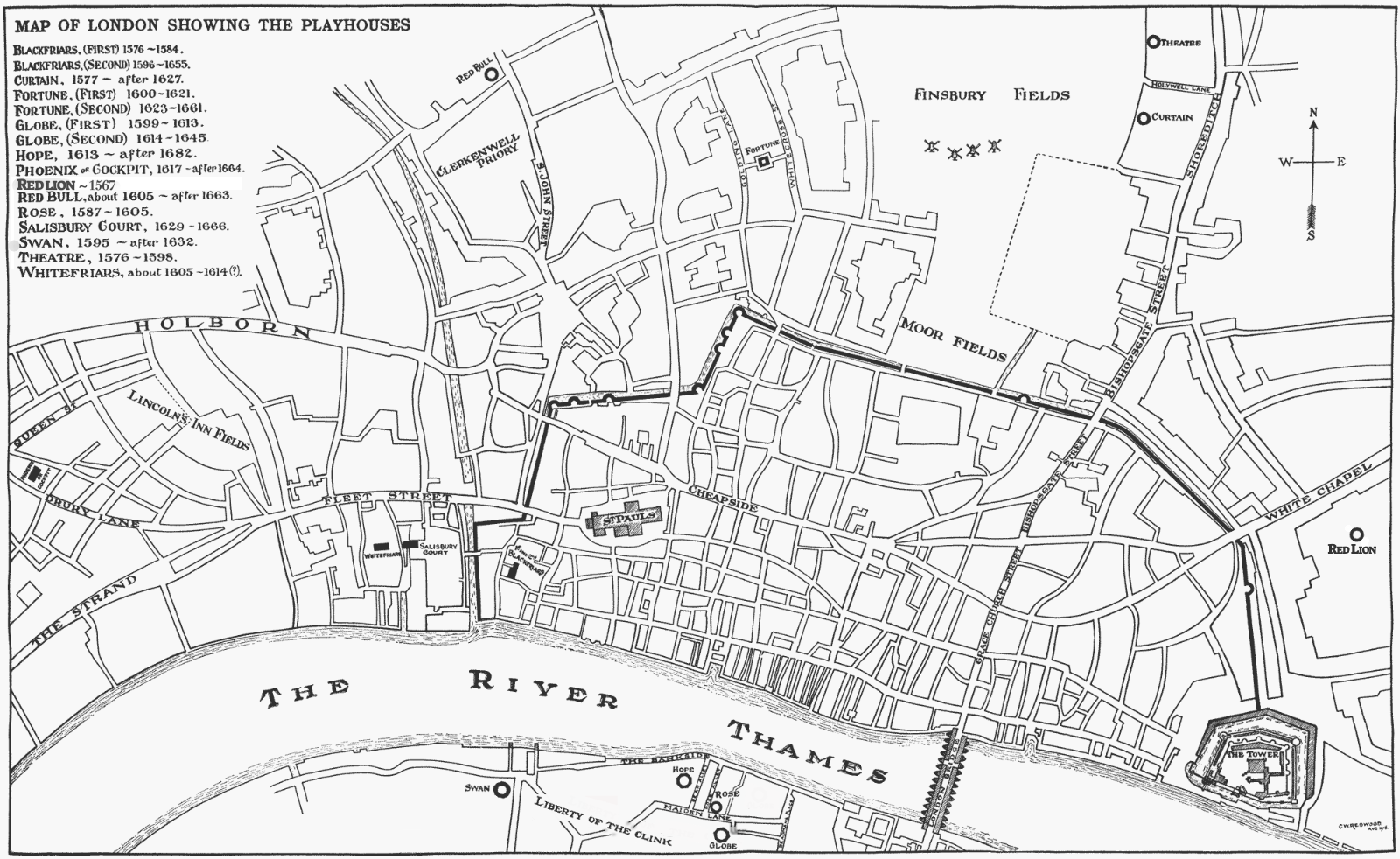
Location of the Fortune Playhouse, top centre

The Fortune Theatre was contemporary with Shakespeare's Globe, The Swan and others; it stood in the parish of St Giles-without-Cripplegate, to the west of the Shoreditch locations of The Theatre and the Curtain Theatre, between Whitecross Street and Golden Lane in what is today named Fortune Street, just outside the City of London. Between 1600 and 1642, it was among the chief venues for drama in London. The site is said to have originally been occupied by a nursery for the children of Henry VIII.

The Fortune was erected as the second half of a substantial realignment of London's chief acting companies. In 1597, the Lord Chamberlain's Men had left, or rather been ejected, from The Theatre; they abandoned Shoreditch and in 1599 constructed a new theatre, the Globe, in Southwark. The Admiral's Men, then playing in the nearby and aging Rose Theatre, suddenly faced stiff competition for Bankside audiences.

At this point, the Admiral's manager Philip Henslowe and his stepson-in-law, the leading actor Edward Alleyn, made plans to move to Shoreditch; Alleyn appears to have funded the new theatre, later selling half-interest to his father-in-law. They paid £240 for a thirty-year lease on a plot of land between tenements on Golding and Whitecross Lane. They hired Peter Street, who had just finished building the Globe, to make them a playhouse. Street was paid £440 for the construction job; with another £80 spent for painting and incidental expenses, the cost of the physical building was £520. The total expenses for the project, including the securing of property rights and clearances of previous leases, came to £1,320. Maintaining the theatre cost about £120 per year in the first decade of its existence.

Because the contract for the construction was preserved among Alleyn's papers, a good deal more is known about the Fortune than about the other outdoor theatres. The document also casts some light on the features of the Globe, since Henslowe and Alleyn planned their theatre with an eye on their rival's venue; many of the details in the contract are for sizes equal to or bigger than the Globe's equivalent.

=== Design ===
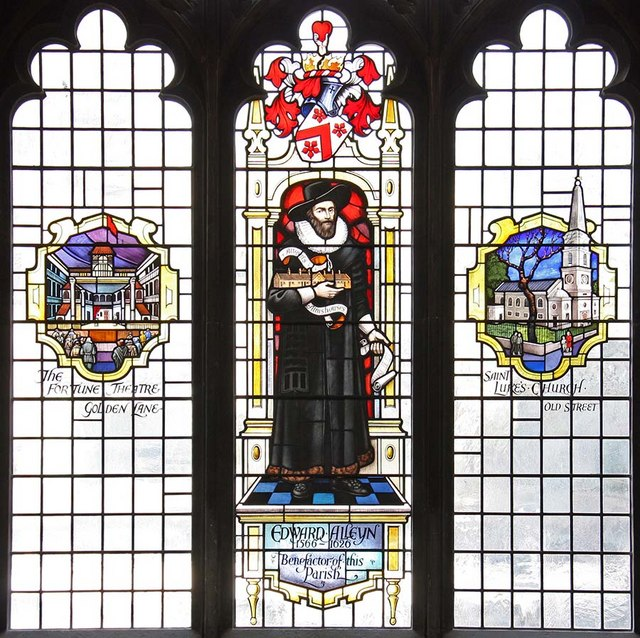
A depiction of the Fortune in a stained glass memorial to Edward Alleyn

The plot of land on which the theatre sat was approximately square, 127 feet (39 m) across and 129 feet (39 m) deep. The theatre was built on a foundation of lime and brick; square-shaped (uniquely among the period's amphitheatres), each wall measured eighty feet outside and fifty-five within. The building was three stories tall; the first-floor galleries were twelve feet high, those on the second floor eleven; those on the third, nine. Each row of galleries was twelve feet deep. Henslowe and Alleyn specified that the Fortune outdo the Globe "in every point for scantlings"; they also provided, in accordance with common practice, for two-penny rooms and gentlemen's rooms. The building was constructed of lath and plaster, with wood floors in the galleries.

its attachment to the stage is unknown but presumably similar to that of the Swan. The stage was forty-three feet across; it was covered with tile.

=== First theatre ===
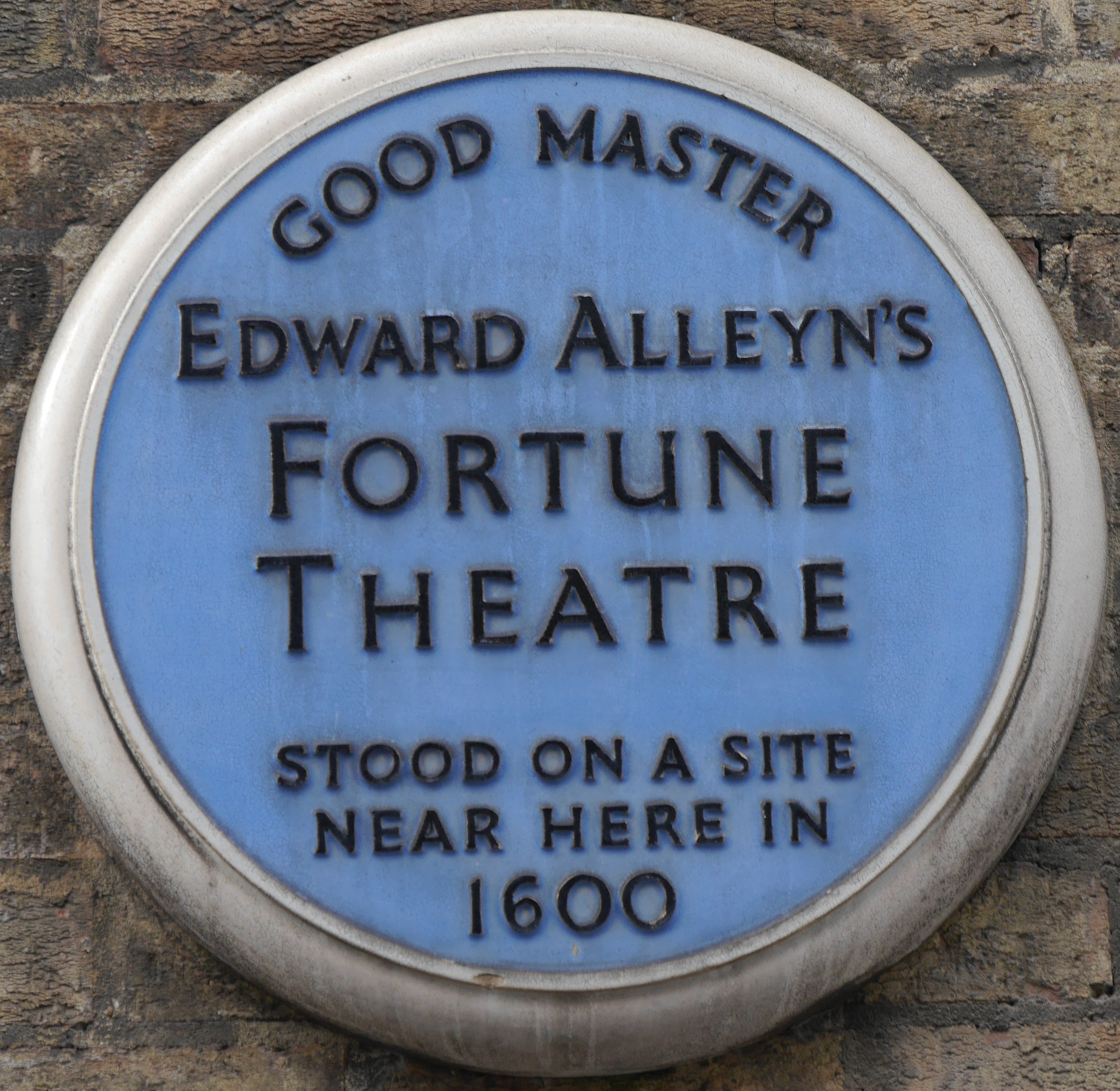
Plaque in Fortune Street, London

Henslowe and Alleyn's plans met with considerable opposition from the neighbourhood and city officials. With the aid of their patron, Charles Howard, the Lord Admiral, they secured permission from the Privy Council for the venture. Henslowe seems also to have soothed his neighbors' worries by pledging substantial amounts to charity in the parish.

The theatre housed the Admiral's Men by late 1600, as revealed by correspondence of the Venetian ambassador in London. This troupe remained as tenants for more than two decades, surviving the deaths of both Henslowe and Alleyn, and remaining fairly stable under the successive patronage of Prince Henry and Lord Palsgrave. Upon Henslowe's death, Alleyn assumed full control of the property.

Originally described as the "fairest play-house in the town," the Fortune suffered a slow decline in reputation over the decades. In 1605, notorious roisterer Mary Frith may have appeared on the boards, singing and playing a lute; it is not clear from the consistory court records in which this event is described if the players were a party to her antics. In 1612, the theatre was mentioned by name in a city order suppressing the post-performance jigs, which authorities believed led to fist-fights and thefts. That this belief had some merit is suggested by a case the next year, in which a country farmer stabbed a city gentleman. In 1614, Thomas Tomkiss's academic play Albumazar linked the Fortune and the Red Bull Theatre as raucous places to see old-fashioned fare such as The Spanish Tragedy. The aspersion stuck, as did the conjunction of north-side theatres.

Yet the conventional view should not be exaggerated; on one and perhaps two occasions, ambassadors visited the theatre. On the first and less certain occasion, a member of the Venetian delegation, Orazio Busino, describes a visit in December 1617 to a theatre that may have been the Fortune. On the second, the notorious Gondomar certainly visited Alleyn and the others there in 1621; after the performance the players held a banquet in his honour.

=== Second theatre ===
On 9 December 1621, the Fortune burned to the ground, taking with it the company's stock of plays and properties. To meet the £1000 cost of rebuilding, Alleyn formed a partnership of twelve sharers, each paying an initial amount of £83 6s. 8d. By then aged and busy with Dulwich College, he took only one share for himself, and leased the property to the company's sharers for £128 per year. (The shareholders paid Alleyn £10 13s. 10d. each annually, and in return split the profits of the theatre, and the expenses of running it, twelve ways.) The theatre re-opened in March 1623. When Alleyn died in 1626, the college assumed control of the lease; the actor Richard Gunnell became its manager. Yet this change does not appear to have changed operations at the theatre. The new theatre appears to have been made of brick, with a lead and tile roof as fire-proofing measure. It also seems to have been round, abandoning its unconventional square shape.

The reputation of the theatre did not improve after its reconstruction. In 1626, it was the scene of a riot involving sailors, in the course of which a constable was assaulted. In 1628, a protégé of Buckingham was assaulted by a mob after leaving a performance there.

In 1631, Palsgrave's Men moved to the playhouse at Salisbury Court; they were replaced at the Fortune by the actors of the King's Revels. The only play definitely associated with this period is a comedy, now lost, by William Heminges, son of John Heminges. In 1635, a company that had been at the Red Bull Theatre occupied the theatre, only to meet a notable run of bad fortune: plague closed the theatres for more than a year, from May 1636 to October 1637. Since they had no income from the theatre, the twelve shareholders in the theatre fell seriously arrears in their payments to Dulwich College, by more than £165.

In 1639, the actors were fined £1000 for depicting a religious ceremony on stage – this depiction was taken as anti-Catholic, but in the late 1630s, almost any reference to religion was risky. This group returned to the Red Bull at Easter 1640, and the remnants of Palsgrave's company, now under the patronage of the young Prince Charles and therefore called Prince Charles's Men, returned to the Fortune.

When Parliament ordered all theatres closed in 1642, the Fortune entered a slow but irreversible decline. The actors at least occasionally violated the order, for they were raided and their property seized during a performance almost a year after the closure; between the expiration of the original order and the enactment of new, more stringent orders in 1649, the players returned to the theatre. In 1649, soldiers pulled down the stage and the gallery seats. By the Restoration, it had partially collapsed, and the masters of Dulwich sold what remained as scrap.

== Replica theatres ==
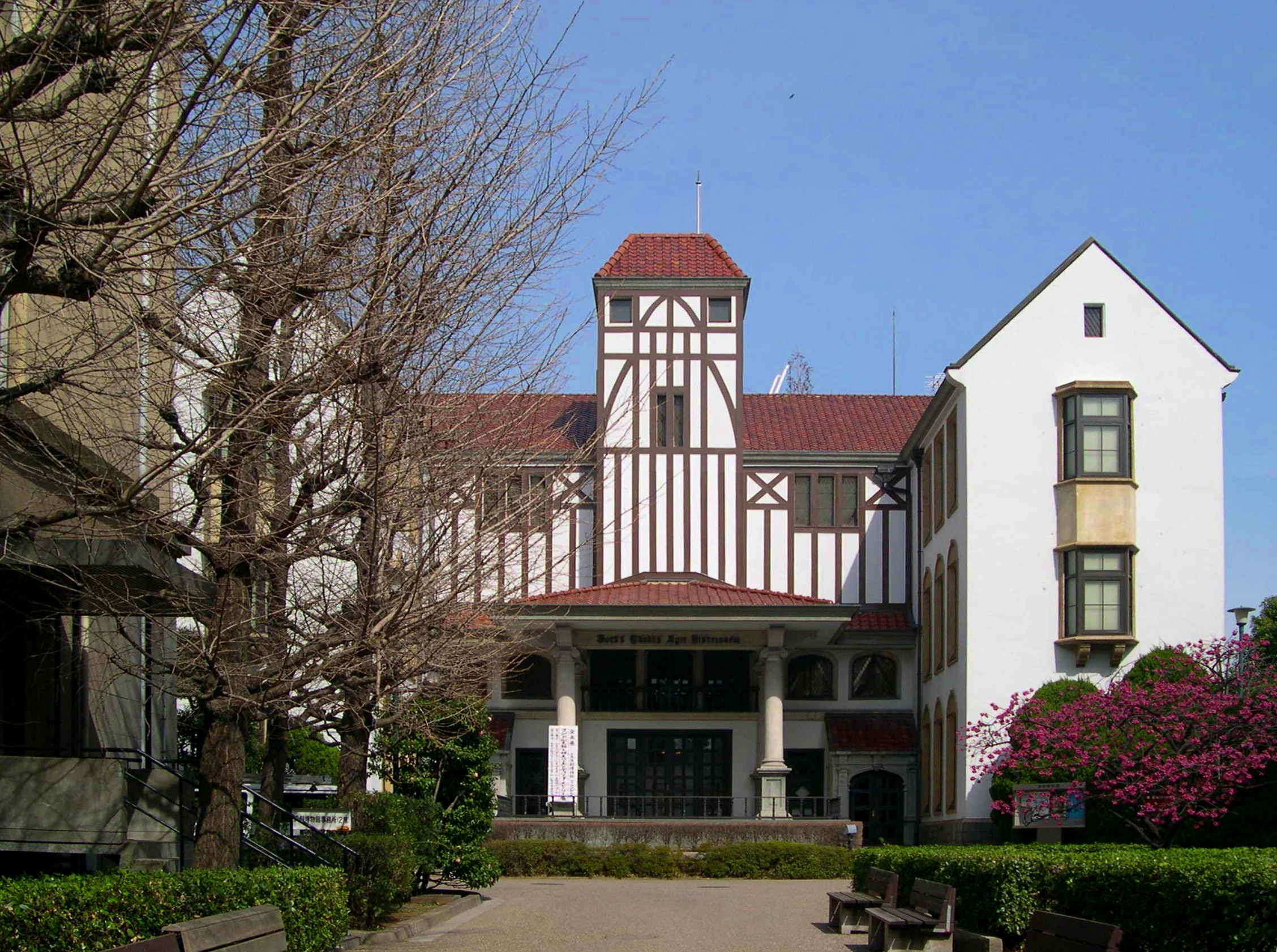
The Tsubouchi Memorial Theatre Museum in Tokyo, based on the Fortune.

The 1599 contract for building the Fortune Theatre was found in the papers of theatrical manager Philip Henslowe at Dulwich College. The contract gives some overall dimensions of the Fortune but there are no plans or elevations.

- The New Fortune Theatre at the University of Western Australia in Perth, opened in 1964, was the first known replica of the original building.
- The Allen Elizabethan Theatre at the Oregon Shakespeare Festival in Ashland, Oregon, designed by Richard L. Hay, uses the dimensions from the contract but the stage's appearance and arrangements are speculation, as the original plans have never been found.
- The Waseda University Tsubouchi Memorial Theatre Museum in Tokyo, Japan, built in 1928 is also modelled after the playhouse.
- The Gdańsk Shakespeare Theatre in Gdańsk, Poland, is built on the site of a 17th-century theatre, known as the Gdańsk Fencing School, which is believed to have been modelled on the first Fortune Theatre. Though not an exact reproduction, the modern theatre incorporates elements from the designs of the earlier theatres.

== See also ==
- List of English Renaissance theatres
