= Red Bull Theatre =

Historic London public playhouse built around 1605

Coordinates: 51.524259°N 0.103336°W

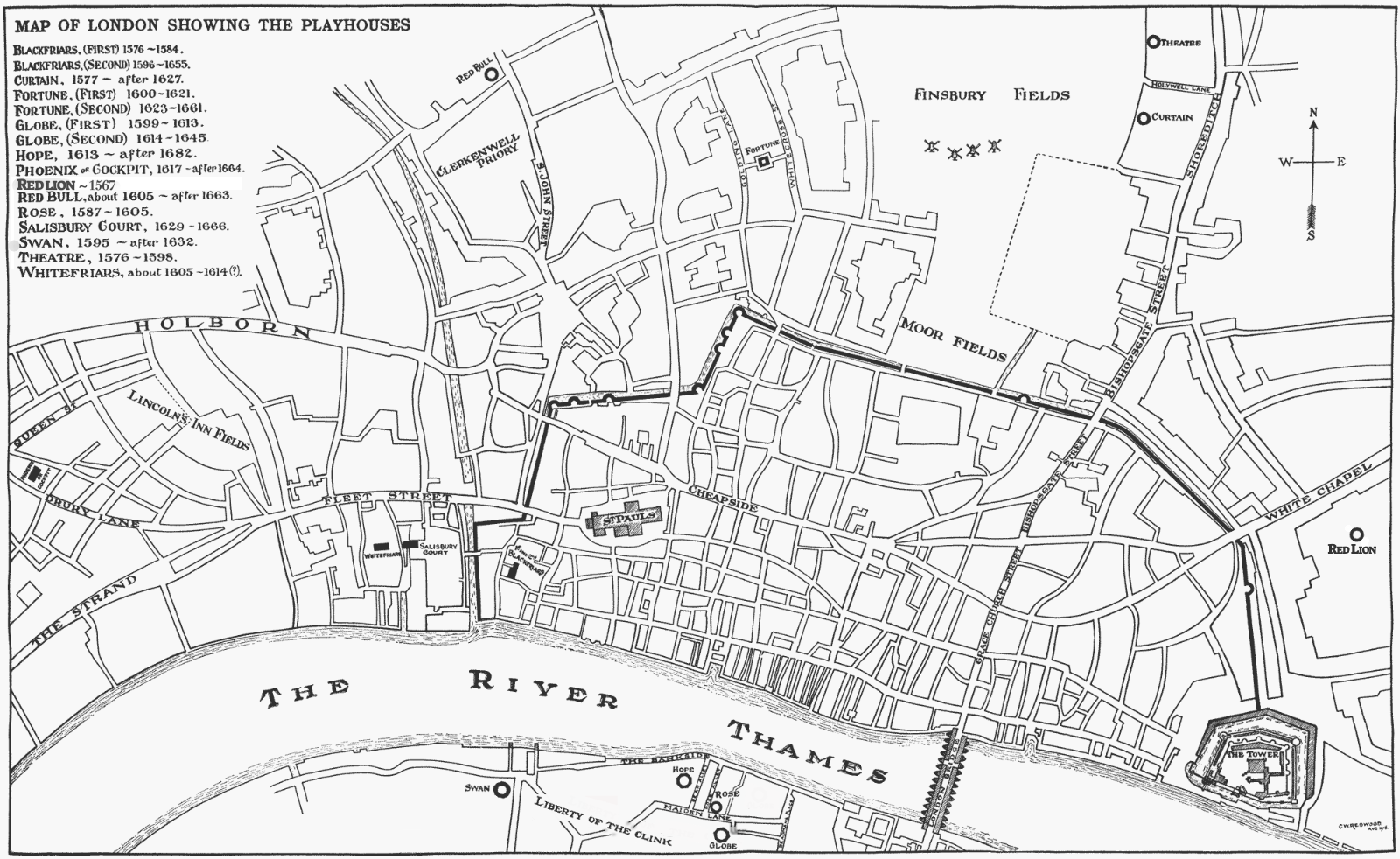
Plan of London in the late 16th and early 17th centuries, showing the locations of playhouses: the Red Bull lies to the north-west of the City

The Red Bull Theatre was an inn-yard conversion erected in Clerkenwell, London, operating in the 17th century. For more than forty years, it entertained audiences drawn primarily from the City and its suburbs, developing a reputation over the years for rowdiness. After Parliament closed the theatres in 1642, it continued to host illegal performances intermittently, and when the theatres reopened after the Restoration, it became a legitimate venue again. There is a myth that it burned down in the Great Fire of London but the direct reason for its end is unclear.

== Design ==
The Red Bull was constructed in about 1605 on St John Street in Clerkenwell on a site corresponding to the eastern end of modern-day Hayward's Place. Contemporary documents reveal that it was converted from a yard in an inn. This origin accounts for its square-ish shape, shared, for example, by the original Fortune Theatre among playhouses of the time. The Red Bull inn's name may relate to drovers bringing cattle down St John Street toward the markets at Smithfield. The conversion was undertaken by Aaron Holland, owner of the inn from 1602, on land he (along with an actor named Martin Slatier or Slater) had leased from Anne Bedingfeild, the inheritrix of a wealthy local brewer. Evidence indicates that its size was comparable to Globe Theatre and Fortune, its competitors. W. J. Lawrence argued that the theatre was roofed over in the early 1620s, but this idea was largely refuted by Leslie Hotson and G. E. Bentley. The Red Bull was most likely similar to the other outdoor theatres against which it competed, with an uncurtained thrust-forward stage backed by a tiring house and balcony, surrounded by standing room, and overlooked by galleries on three walls. It may well have held more than the capacity of The Globe.

== History ==
=== Jacobean and Caroline ===
With the abatement of the plague epidemic in 1604, entrepreneur Aaron Holland (in the service of Earl of Devonshire) secured a lease on the Red Bull inn for conversion to a theatre. At the end of that year he agreed with the actor Martin Slatier to form a new company of players, and secured the essential aristocratic patronage from Ulrik, Duke of Holstein, younger brother to Queen Anne. (Perhaps because they had learned from Philip Henslowe's recent problems with neighbourhood opposition in building the Fortune, they did not approach the court for approval until they had already placated their parish neighbours—as Henslowe had—by contributing to poor relief.) Thus, the royal patent was in the name Queen Anne's Men. In addition to Martin Slatier, Thomas Swinnerton and Christopher Beeston were known to have owned shares in the enterprise. The company's clown was to be Thomas Greene. The Queen Anne's Men's repertoire included works by prominent playwrights: Thomas Heywood, an actor in the company, contributed the greatest part. John Webster's The White Devil and The Devil's Law-case, Thomas Dekker's If This Be Not A Good Play, the Devil Is in It, and John Cooke's well-known The City Gallant (Thomas Greene's Tu Quoque) were also included. They came into possession also of some older plays, including Christopher Marlowe's Edward II. The audience appears to have disapproved of The White Devil in 1611, and in later years the Red Bull as the cause of, or scene of, noted riots which are recorded in court cases.

In 1616, the Queen's men, now directed by impresario Christopher Beeston, moved into Beeston's new indoor Cockpit Theatre. This was in emulation of the King's Men's acquirement of the Blackfriars, the company now having both the outdoor Red Bull and the Indoor Cockpit. On Shrove Tuesday 1617, a mob of apprentices attacked the Cockpit but the theatre was re-established and was a successful venue into the Restoration. The first company was succeeded at the Red Bull by Prince Charles's Men. The disintegration of Queen Anna's men after Anne's death in 1619 produced a little-understood reshuffling of these companies. In the decline of the Jacobean period, this company produced plays including Dekker and Massinger's The Virgin Martyr, Thomas May's The Heir, and Gervase Markham and William Sampson's Herod and Antipater.

After James's death, Charles assumed patronage of the King's Men, and the former Prince Charles's Men disbanded. From this date, an even less reputable company took up residence at the Red Bull. Scholars generally call this troupe the Red Bull company, as the actors called themselves when in London; when touring, as they did frequently, they styled themselves the King's Players. In 1627, Henry Herbert, acting on a request from John Heminges, ordered this company to cease performing Shakespeare's plays. In November 1629, the theatre hosted visiting French actors who had earlier played at the Fortune and Blackfriars Theatre; a contemporary reference may indicate that this troupe, which included women, was poorly received in Clerkenwell.

By 1634, the Red Bull housed a new company patronized by the child Prince Charles II. By this point, the Red Bull's reputation was tarnished. But the new company boasted a popular comedian, Andrew Cane, and it was able to survive the Privy Council's anger over the slanderous play The Whore New Vamped, which mocked an alderman by name and complained of recently levied taxes.

=== After 1642 ===
Along with all the other theatres in London, the Red Bull was closed for plays in 1642 by the Commonwealth. In the short term, the prohibition was of limited effect; as late as 1648, the Red Bull hosted a performance of Fletcher's Wit Without Money; advertisements for the performance were thrown into gentlemen's carriages. There followed a crackdown on performances by Parliament, which grew wiser to the real implications of advertisements for "rope dancing" and other entertainments at the old theatres. On 20 December 1649, the Red Bull was successfully raided, a number of actors arrested and imprisoned, and their clothes and properties confiscated.

The Red Bull is the only theatre incontestably associated with drolls, brief farces taken from the most popular older plays. In 1653, Robert Cox was arrested at the Red Bull for a performance which crossed the line and was deemed a play. Sir William Davenant and Sir George Fletcher reportedly watched a play at the Red Bull in February or March 1655. In September 1655, the Red Bull was raided again as part of the same sterner attitude that led Cromwell's soldiers to deface the Fortune and Blackfriars, and actors were arrested for performing there in 1659.

A collection of drolls was published by Francis Kirkman, some attributed to "the incomparable Robert Cox", as The Wits (1662, and enlarged 1672–73). Kirkman said many had been performed at the Red Bull; however, the frontispiece to his volume does not necessarily represent a performance at the venue, as was once assumed—the drawing shows footlights and a candelabra, whereas the Red Bull mounted only open-air, daylight performances.

The theatre was re-opened in 1660 upon the Restoration of the monarchy, as home for Michael Mohun's company and George Jolly's troupe. Its new management returned to the business of staging crowd-pleasing drama; on 23 March 1661 Samuel Pepys recorded seeing a revival of William Rowley's All's Lost by Lust there, but he notes that the work was "poorly done, with…much disorder". By the following year the building was given over to prize fights and public demonstrations of fencing. The Red Bull came to an end around 1665 or 1666, but this had nothing to do with the Great Fire of London, which stopped some distance south.

Buildings were constructed on the site of the playhouse, but the situation of the passageway from the auditorium to St John Street can still be traced at its location off Hayward's Place. In 2018 Islington Council erected a commemorative plaque to the theatre at 3 Hayward's Place.

== Legacy ==
Founded in 2003, Red Bull Theater of New York City takes its name and inspiration from the original Red Bull.

== See also ==
- List of English Renaissance theatres

== Notes ==
=== References ===
- Brown, Charles Cedric, ed. (1993). Patronage, Politics, and Literary Traditions in England, 1558–1658. Detroit: Wayne State University Press.
- Griffith, Eva (2001). "New Material for a Jacobean Theatre: The Red Bull Theatre on the Seckford Estate". Theatre Notebook. 55.
- —— (2008) [2004]. "Bedingfeild [née Draper], Anne (1560–1641)". Oxford Dictionary of National Biography (online ed.). Oxford University Press. doi:10.1093/ref:odnb/74436. (Subscription or UK public library membership required.)
- —— (2009). "Christopher Beeston: his Property and Properties". In Dutton, Richard (ed.). The Oxford Handbook of Early Modern Theatre. Oxford University Press. ISBN 9780199287246.
- —— (2011). "Martin Slatiar and the Red Bull Playhouse". Huntington Library Quarterly. 74 (4): 553–574. doi:10.1525/hlq.2011.74.4.553.
- —— (2013). A Jacobean Company and its Playhouse: The Queen's Servants at the Red Bull Theatre (c.1605–1619). Cambridge University Press. ISBN 9781107041882.
- Wickham, Glynne; Berry, Herbert; Ingram, William (2000). English Professional Theatre 1530–1660. Cambridge University Press. ISBN 9780521230124.
