= Thomas Pope (actor) =

Thomas Pope (died 1603), also credited as Thomas Poope in the First Folio, was an English actor in the Elizabethan theatre, a member of the Lord Chamberlain's Men and a colleague of William Shakespeare. According to F. E. Halliday, Pope was a "comedian and acrobat."

== Early life ==
Nothing is known of Pope's early life. He was one of the English players who toured Denmark and Saxony in 1586–87, along with George Bryan, another future Chamberlain's man. He was in the production of The Seven Deadly Sins c. 1591, which was performed by a combination of personnel from Lord Strange's Men and the Admiral's Men, and which starred Edward Alleyn and included Bryan, Richard Burbage, Augustine Phillips, Richard Cowley, and John Sinklo, all soon-to-be Lord Chamberlain's Men. Pope toured with Lord Strange's Men under Edward Alleyn in 1593, with most of the same personnel.

== Chamberlain's Men ==
Pope was most likely an original member of the Lord Chamberlain's Men at their re-constitution in 1594, along with Shakespeare, Burbage, and the others. He was a figure of some significance in the early phase of the company's history, in that he and John Heminges were the payees for their Court performances – a responsibility that would have been given only to trusted members. Though no information has survived on his specific roles, it is thought that his physique and style most suited the comic character of stout, braggartly cowards, such as Falstaff and Sir Toby Belch, although he is also conjectured to have performed in dramatic roles, such as Mercutio and Shylock. He was also cast in the two Ben Jonson plays acted by the company in the late 1590s, Every Man in His Humour (1598) and Every Man Out of His Humour (1599). In 1599 he also became one of the original sharers in the new Globe Theatre. He was no longer part of the company when they became the King's Men in 1603; he might have been retired by then, and in fact died in that year. Like some other actors and members of his troupe (Shakespeare; Phillips), Pope lived in Southwark, near the theatres; he is thought to have remained unmarried.

== Post mortem ==
Pope's last will and testament was dated 22 July 1603 (and probated on 13 February 1604). He left legacies to two other actors, one of whom was Robert Gough, an actor with the Lord Chamberlain's Men who continued with the King's Men after 1603. The other was a John Edmans, or Edmonds. Pope left Gough and Edmans "all my wearing apparel, and all my arms, to be equally divided between them." Pope also left his share in the Globe, and a share in the Curtain Theatre, to a Mary Clark; in 1612 the Globe share was owned by a John and Mary Edmans – she, presumably, being the former Mary Clark.

The fact that Pope owned a share in the Curtain Theatre, where the Lord Chamberlain's Men had acted in the 1597–99 era, is significant for an understanding of an important facet of the development of English Renaissance theatre. [For the importance of the Curtain shares, see: John Underwood.]
