= John Sinklo =

16th/17th-century English actor

John Sinklo (also Sinclo, Sincklo, Sincler, Sinkler, Sinclair) was an English Renaissance theatre actor, known to be active between 1592 and 1604. He was a member of several playing companies, including Lord Strange's Men, Pembroke's Men, Lord Chamberlain's Men and the King's Men. It is likely that Sinklo also performed with Sussex's Men, following the text of Titus Andronicus which Sussex's inherited from Pembroke's.

Sinklo is identified by name in three plays by Shakespeare (an honour he shares with William Kemp). He therefore provides a strong example of Shakespeare's familiarity with the abilities and peculiarities of the cast for whom he was writing. In Sinklo’s case, it was his lean, emaciated appearance which singled him out for attention. Stanley Wells postulates that he 'must have been an amiable, long-suffering man, well accustomed to tolerating jokes about his appearance'.

== Shakespeare's references ==
Sinklo is named in the following Shakespeare texts:

- The Induction to The Taming of the Shrew, one of the players who tricks Christopher Sly is headed 'Sincklo' in the First Folio.
- The opening of Act 3 of Henry VI, Part 3 in a stage direction: ‘Enter Sinklo, and Humfrey, with Crosse-bowes in their hands’
- The 1600 quarto of Henry IV, Part 2 (5.4), in the stage direction: ‘Enter Sincklo and three or foure officers’.

== Roles ==
Sinklo was a hired actor, usually cast for low class or lower middle class minor roles. The stage direction ‘Enter Sincklo and three or foure officers’ within the 1600 quarto of Henry IV, Part 2, for example, is replaced by ‘Enter Hostesse Quickly, Dol Tear-sheete, and Beadles’ in the First Folio, suggesting that Sinklo was to play a beadle. Much is made of Sinklo's skinny physique in this role, and the insults levelled at him by Doll Tearsheet include one tirade in which he is called "nut-hook" and "damned tripe-visaged rascal". In another rant he is called "thin man in a censer...you bluebottle rogue, you filthy famished correctioner". Mistress Quickly calls him a "starved bloodhound".

In the plot of The Seven Deadly Sins, Sinklo is named as 'A Keeper'.

Sinklo is named by John Webster in his special Induction to Marston's The Malcontent from 1604, being introduced by William Sly to Richard Burbage as 'Master Doomsday's son, the userer'. In this particular role, Sinklo declines the invitation to sit between the legs of another character for fear of being taken for a viol-de-gamba by the audience: Sinklo is therefore associated with the role of Andrew Aguecheek in Twelfth Night who 'plays o'the' viol-de-gamboys' (1.3.23–4).

Based on his thin appearance, other characters Sinklo could have played include:

- Master Pinch in The Comedy of Errors, described as 'a hungry-faced villain' (5.1.238)
- The Apothecary in Romeo and Juliet, told by Romeo that 'famine is in thy cheeks' (5.1.69)
- Thersites in Troilus and Cressida, described as a 'fragment' (5.1.8)
- Robert Faulconbridge in King John, whose legs are described as 'riding-rods' and has arms 'like eel-skins stuff’d' (1.1.140–142)
- Slender in Merry Wives of Windsor
- Starveling in A Midsummer Night's Dream
- Shift in Every Man out of His Humour
- Nano the dwarf in Volpone
- Asinius Bubo in Satiromastix
- The 'very little man' in The London Prodigal.
