= The Seven Deadly Sins (play) =

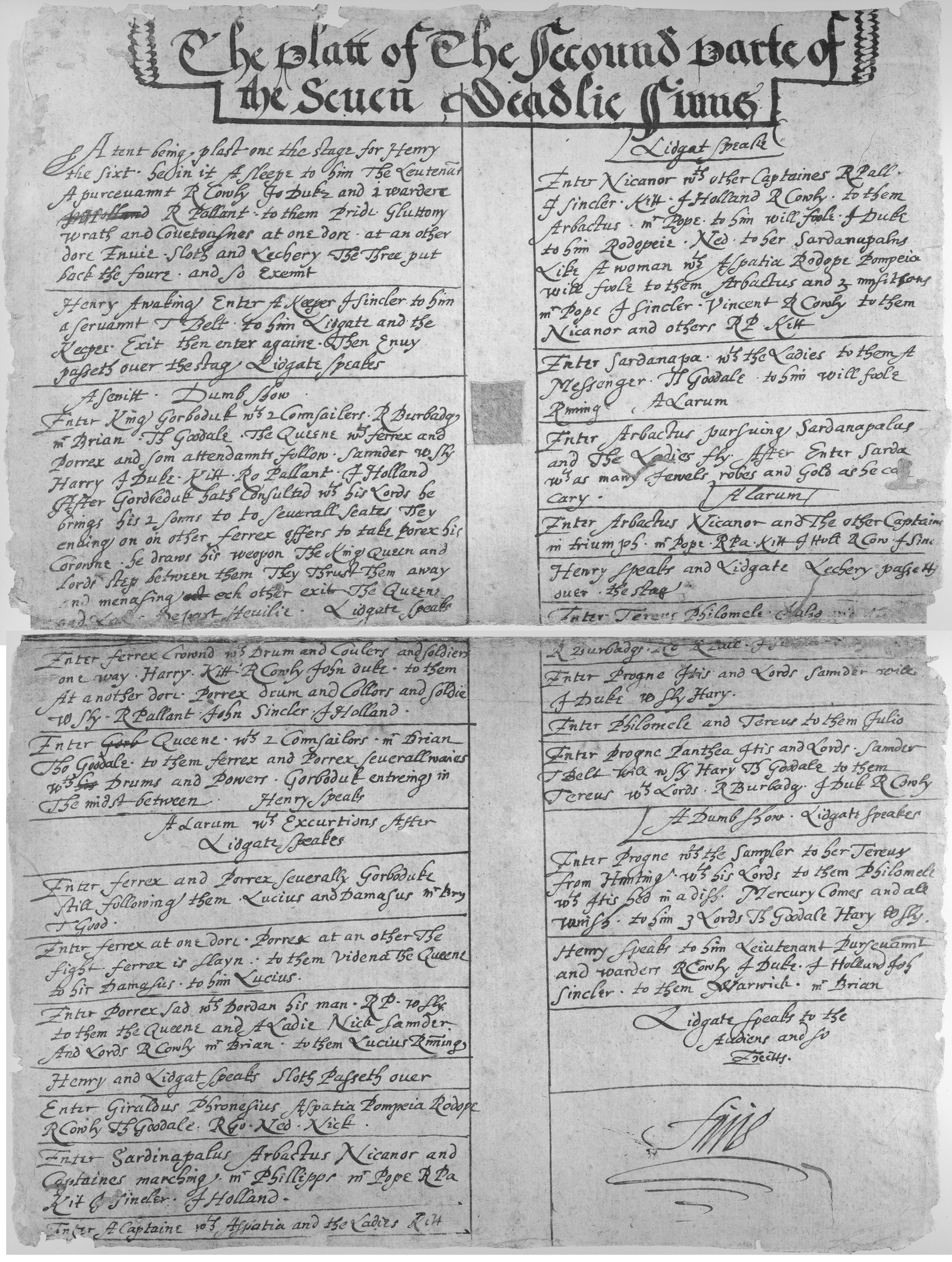
Plot of the Second Part of the Seven Deadly Sins, ca. 1597–98.

The Seven Deadly Sins was a two-part play written c. 1585, attributed to Richard Tarlton, and most likely premiered by his company, Queen Elizabeth's Men. The play drew upon the medieval tradition of the morality play; though it was very popular in its time, no copy of either part has survived.

== The "plot" ==
The play is significant, however, because the "plot" of Part 2 still exists; it was discovered in the cover of a 17th-century manuscript play, The Tell Tale, in a collection at Dulwich College. Originally assumed to be part of Edward Alleyn's papers, subsequent investigation suggests it was part of the collection bequeathed by player-bookseller William Cartwright the younger (c.1606–86), and was obtained by Edmond Malone when he traded the college some old religious tracts for plays from the Cartwright bequest. As the term was used in English Renaissance theatre, the "plot" of a play was a chart that summarized its action; it was posted in the "tiring house" or backstage area of a theatre. The plot of S.D.S. 2 has a square hole punched in its middle, where it was hung on a board for all to read. The cast members of an Elizabethan dramatic production had their own parts written out for them, with relevant entrances and cues — but they did not have their own individual copies of the play text as a whole. So the posted plot was an important resource in keeping the production organized. Surviving Elizabethan plots are extremely rare — only half a dozen exist.

The existing plot for S.D.S. 2 is not from the original production c. 1585, but from a later production c. 1597–98. It was acted by personnel from Chamberlain's Men at The Theatre, the first of the large public theatres of the Elizabethan era. The plot shows that Part 2 consisted of episodes concerning three of the seven deadly sins, Envy, Sloth, and Lechery; S.D.S. 1 must therefore have dealt with Greed, Gluttony, Wrath, and Pride.

== The cast ==
That cast names many of the players of the Lord Chamberlain's Men, including two boys apprenticed to John Heminges in 1595 and 1597. The plot refers to the production's personnel sometimes under the actors' names, sometimes by nicknames, and sometimes only by their roles; but at least a partial reconstruction of the actors and their roles is possible:

Actor	Induction	Envy	Sloth	Lechery
George Bryan	Warwick	Damascus		
Richard Burbage		Gorboduc		Tereus
"Harry" (Henry Condell?)		Ferrex		a lord
Richard Cowley	a lieutenant	a soldier; a lord	Giraldus; a musician	a lord
Augustine Phillips			Sardanapalus	
Thomas Pope			Arbactus	
John Sinkler	a keeper	a soldier	a captain; a musician	Mercury (?)
William Sly		Porrex		a lord
"Ro. Go."			Aspasia	
"Kit"		a soldier	a captain	

"Ro. Go.," the actor (most likely a boy player) who filled a female role, might have been Robert Gough, who was with the Chamberlain's/King's troupe down to 1621. "Kit" might have been Christopher Beeston, who was with the Chamberlain's in the 1598–1602 period. The plot also mentions Robert Pallant, John Duke, and John Holland, all Lord Chamberlain's Men, and Thomas Goodale, a hired player. Other players named on the lot include Vincent (Thomas Vincent?), T. Belt (Thomas Belt), Saunder (Alexander Cooke), Nick (Nicholas Tooley?), Ned (Edmund Shakespeare?), and Will (William Ostler? William Ecclestone?).
