= The Malcontent =

Play by John Marston

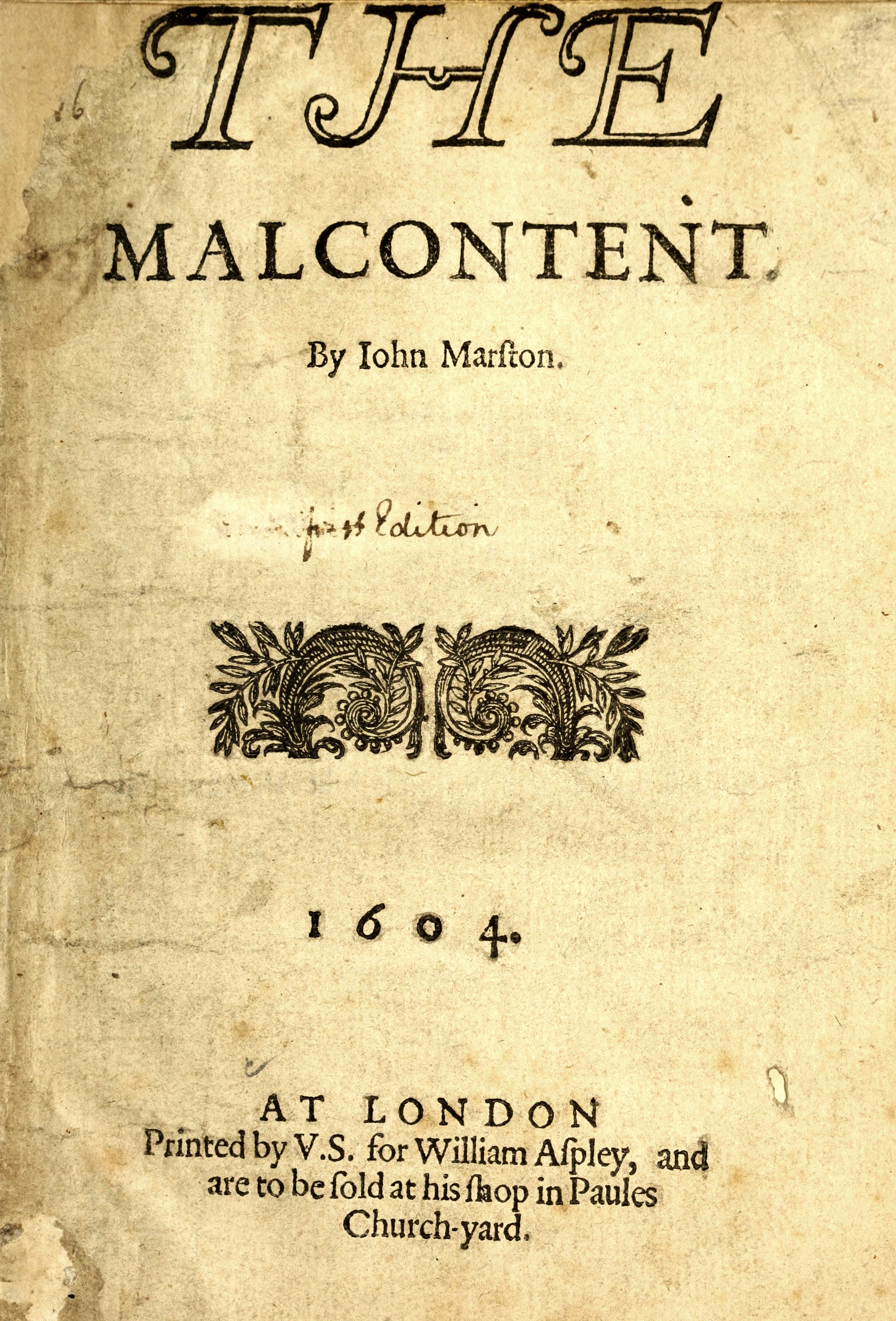
Title page of the first edition of The Malcontent (1604)

The Malcontent is an early Jacobean stage play written by the dramatist and satirist John Marston ca. 1603. The play was one of Marston's most successful works. It is widely regarded as one of the most significant plays of the English Renaissance; an extensive body of scholarly research and critical commentary has accumulated around it.

== Performance ==
The play was first performed by the Children of the Queen's Revels, one of the troupes of boy actors active in the era, in the Blackfriars Theatre. It was later taken over by the King's Men, the adult company for which William Shakespeare worked, and performed at the Globe Theatre. The King's Men's production featured a new induction, written by John Webster, and several new scenes, probably written by Marston himself. These additions may have been necessary because the original play was too short for the King's Men's purposes: plays for the boys' companies tended to involve more musical interludes than those of the adult companies, and so be shorter.

== Publication ==
The Malcontent was entered into the Stationers' Register on 5 July 1604, and published later the same year in quarto in three states, the second and third containing the additions by Marston and the induction by Webster. All three texts of the first edition were printed by Valentine Simmes for the bookseller William Aspley.

== Characters ==
- Giovanni Altofronto/Malevole - The deposed Duke of Genoa, disguised at court as the malcontent Malevole.
- Pietro Jacomo - Current Duke of Genoa, having usurped Altofronto.
- Mendoza - adopted heir and protégé of Pietro, Aurelia's lover.
- Aurelia - Wife of Pietro, Duchess of Genoa.
- Ferneze - Courtier, also Aurelia's lover.
- Celso - Altofronto's trusted friend and spy at court.
- Maria - Imprisoned wife of Altofronto.
- Maquerelle - Aurelia's lady in waiting.
- Bilioso - An old Marshall.
- Prepasso - A gentleman usher.
- Ferrardo - Pietro's minion.
- Equato and Guerrino - Two courtiers.
- Emilia and Bianca - Aurelia's attendant ladies.
- Pasarello - Bilioso's fool.

== The Induction ==
The Induction to this revised version is a metatheatrical one, in which the play's actors and its onstage spectators comment on the drama that is to follow and discuss the "bitterness" of its satire. King's Men actors Richard Burbage, John Lowin, and Henry Condell appear as themselves, while William Sly appears as a young theater-goer and John Sinklo appears as "Doomsday," his cousin. The gallant asks Condell how King's Men came to mount a Blackfriar's play, and Condell answers, "Why not Malevole in folio with us, as Jeronimo in decimosexto with them?" He suggests that the boys (compared to a sextodecimo sheet) had stolen a King's Men's play, possibly a sequel to Thomas Kyd's The Spanish Tragedy, and so they stole Blackfriars's Malcontent for their folio-sized actors.

== Synopsis ==
The court of Duke Pietro of Genoa is abuzz with talk of their mysterious new guest, Malevole. While not in his chamber performing discordant music, Malevole spends his time openly criticizing the court and its courtiers, steadfastly refusing to engage in any sort of flattery. While this earns him the ire of many, he is embraced by Pietro, as he "gives good intelligence" to his spirit, and makes him "understand those weaknesses which others flattery palliates." Having earned Pietro's trust and respect, Malevole reveals that Pietro's wife, Aurelia, has been carrying on an affair with Pietro's adopted heir and protégé, Mendoza. Malevole further incites Pietro against the pair by declaring the situation most unnatural, as cuckolding is a creation of woman rather than God, and by highlighting the incestuous nature of the adultery.

As the enraged Pietro rushes off to confront Mendoza, Malevole meets with his friend Celso. It is revealed that Malevole is, in fact, Altofronto, the former Duke of Genoa, deposed in a political coup staged by Mendoza on behalf of Pietro, made powerful through an alliance with Florence solidified by his marriage to Aurelia. Malevole, with the help of his spy Celso, has been learning the strengths, weaknesses, and secrets of his enemies, biding his time in the usurper's court until the opportune moment to strike presents itself. While Malevole schemes in Genoa, his wife Maria has been imprisoned, faithfully awaiting his return.

Meanwhile, Pietro confronts Mendoza, accusing him of treachery and adultery. Although Pietro threatens to kill him. Mendoza, knowing that Aurelia has not only been unfaithful with him, but also with the courtier Ferneze, shifts the Duke's attention, revealing Ferneze's treachery. He convinces the Duke to break into Aurelia's chambers; if he should find Ferneze there, and he attempts to flee, that should serve as proof of their adultery. For the most part, Mendoza's plan works, yet unbeknownst to him Ferneze is not killed but escapes, injured. The wounded Ferneze seeks out Altofronto, seeking aid and protection, both of which the former Duke provides.

Later, Mendoza and Aurelia plot to murder Pietro, with Aurelia promising to use her influence with Florence to have Mendoza appointed Duke of Genoa after her husband's death. Mendoza approaches Malevole to carry out the murder while Pietro is away hunting. Malevole accepts the task and gifts Mendoza two boxes, both of which contain fumes. The fumes of one box cause those who inhale to fall into a deep, deathlike sleep for twelve hours. The fumes of the second cause instant death. Impressed by Malevole's seeming willingness to aid him in his plans, Mendoza divulges his master plan. After Pietro's murder and his dukedom secured by Aurelia, he will publicize her infidelities and subsequently have her banished, making room for him to take Maria as a wife in order to solidify his claim over Genoa. Through Celso, Malevole knows that Maria, still faithful, has no part in Mendoza's schemes. He suggests they manufacture a witness to testify to seeing Pietro, anguished over Aurelia's infidelities, throw himself into the sea, in order to avoid any implication in his death and bolster Mendoza's claims of her infidelity.

Malevole finds Pietro and informs him of Mendoza's plot against him. He disguises him as a hermit and directs him to testify to witnessing his own death. Pietro does as much, and more, lamenting Aurelia's repeated adulteries. Upon hearing his testimony, Mendoza immediately exiles Aurelia, and orders Malevole to deliver terms of marriage to Maria. He also instructs Malevole to murder the disguised Pietro, while at the same time ordering Pietro to murder Malevole. The pair subsequently encounters Aurelia outside Genoa, anguished over the apparent death of Pietro and guilt-stricken over her infidelity. Malevole counsels forgiveness, as many a great man, from Arthur to Hercules, has been the victim of adultery. Pietro acquiesces. Maria is subsequently proved faithful when she rejects Mendoza's offer of riches for her hand in marriage, declaring that regardless of circumstances, Altofronto is her true husband.

Recognizing that the only remaining figure capable of challenging his power is Altofronto, Mendoza uses the lethal box given to him by Malevole to poison him. Though the box turns out to be empty, Altofronto feigns death. Mendoza then accuses Maria of the murder of the hermit, the disguised Pietro, to which Maria responds she would gladly embrace death rather than marry a usurper.

Mendoza throws a lavish masquerade ball to celebrate his rise to power. In attendance are all his supposed victims. At an appointed time, Altofronto, Pietro, and Ferneze all reveal themselves, and Mendoza's schemes are brought to light. Altofronto takes his rightful place as Duke. Mendoza, begging for his life, is exiled, and Pietro and Aurelia are reconciled.

== Political commentary ==
The Malcontent tells the story of the deposed duke Altofront, who has adopted the alter ego of Malevole, a discontented parasite, in order to try to regain his lost dukedom. Malevole is an angry satirist-figure, who attacks the corruption and decadence of the court in which he lives. The degree to which the play is a comment on the court of James I and the immorality of his courtiers is debatable, as the satire is, by and large, general enough to fit any court. However, The Malcontent seemed to some contemporaries to be, like Marston's later plays, a lashing of the new, bumptious, and corrupt Scottish courtiers, and some specific satire is certain. Although Marston warns in his introductory epistle "some things I have willingly erred, as in supposing a Duke of Genoa, and in taking names different from that city’s families", some scholars believe that Marston intended the Genoa presented in The Malcontent to be an accurate historical depiction of the actual city. Domenico Lovascio argues that the rapid-fire succession of leaders in the play is an accurate reflection of the historically politically unstable city, a city rife with corruption, treachery, and plots.

== Malevole as Shakespearean prototype ==
A subject of ongoing critical analysis, the character of Malevole is often discussed as a prototype for other, more famous characters in the Early Modern dramatic canon. He is often described as a forerunner of Shakespeare's Jaques in As You Like It; free of speech and almost professional in their cynicism and melancholy. The similarities in terms of melancholy, deception and revenge have also drawn comparisons with Shakespeare's Hamlet.

== Later productions ==
The play was unacted during the Restoration and through the 18th century. It was revived in 1850 at the Olympic Theatre in London, and was not acted again until the 1960s, with a production in 1964 at Southampton University and then 1968 at Oxford University. There was a professional staging in 1973 by Jonathan Miller, and further student productions in 1980, by RADA and featuring John Sessions, in 1983, by the ADC Theatre in Cambridge (performed in modern dress), and in 1998 by the English Department at Boston University. In 2002 the Royal Shakespeare Company produced a professional staging (with Antony Sher in the role of Malevole), as did the American Shakespeare Center in 2010, and the White Bear Theatre (as part of their Lost Classics Project) in 2011. In 2014 a production, directed by Caitlin Mcleod, was performed by the Globe Young Players (a youth company of twenty 12- to 16-year-olds) at the Sam Wanamaker Playhouse at Shakespeare's Globe Theatre in London from 3 April 2014.

A film noir inspired production of The Malcontent, directed by Austin Sweatman, was performed by Mary Baldwin University's Shakespeare & Performance Graduate Program in February, 2026.
