= George Bryan (actor) =

George Bryan (fl. 1586 – 1613) was an actor in English Renaissance theatre, a member of the Lord Chamberlain's Men with William Shakespeare and Richard Burbage.

Bryan enters the historical record as one of a quintet of English actors who toured Denmark and Saxony in the years 1586 and 1587. He was in the Admiral's Men/Lord Strange's Men production of The Seven Deadly Sins, c. 1591, with Augustine Phillips and William Sly and other future Lord Chamberlain's Men. Bryan may also have toured with the same group of actors under Edward Alleyn in 1593. He is generally believed to have been one of the original members and sharers in the Lord Chamberlain's Men when that company was re-constituted in 1594; he certainly was a key member in 1596, when he and John Heminges received payment for a performance at Court. After that point, however, he apparently left the theatrical profession, seemingly around 1597. In 1603 and in the 1611–13 period, he was recorded as a Groom of the Chamber under James I.
