= Every Man in His Humour =

1598 play written by Ben Jonson

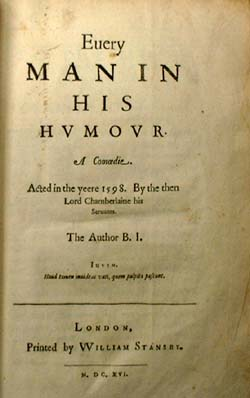
Title page of 1616 printing of Every Man in His Humour

Every Man in His Humour is a 1598 play by the English playwright Ben Jonson. The play belongs to the subgenre of "humours comedy", in which each major character is dominated by an over-riding humour or obsession.

== First performance ==
All the available evidence indicates that the play was performed by the Lord Chamberlain's Men in 1598 at the Curtain Theatre in Shoreditch, London. That date is given in the play's reprint in Jonson's 1616 folio collection of his works; the text of the play (IV, iv, 15) contains an allusion to John Barrose, a Burgundian fencer who challenged all comers that year and was hanged for murder on 10 July 1598. The play was also acted at Court on 2 February 1605.

=== Shakespearean connection ===
A theatre legend first recorded in 1709 by Nicholas Rowe has it that Shakespeare advocated production of the play at a point when the company was about to reject it. While this legend is unverifiable, there is no reason to doubt that Shakespeare was in the original cast, as claimed on the playlist in the 1616 edition. He continued to act at least until 1603, when he performed in Ben Jonson's Sejanus.

It has been suggested that Shakespeare took the part of Kno'well, the aged father, because there is a tradition that he had a habit of playing older characters, such as Adam in As You Like It. However, in 2024 the British press reported on an alternative theory: textual analysis by Shakespeare scholar Dr Darren Freebury-Jones concluded that Shakespeare absorbed phrases from a different role, that of Thorello/Kitely, a jealous husband. Freebury-Jones gave examples of similar phrasing in Othello, Hamlet and Twelfth Night, all plays that are believed to have been written after the premiere of Every Man in His Humour.

== Publication ==
The play was entered into the Register of the Stationers' Company on 4 August 1600, along with the Shakespearean plays As You Like It, Much Ado About Nothing, and Henry V, in an entry marked "to be stayed." It is thought that this entry was an attempt to block publication of the four plays; if so, the attempt failed, since the latter three plays appeared in print soon after. Every Man In His Humour was re-registered ten days later, on 14 August 1600, by the booksellers Cuthbert Burby and Walter Burre; the first quarto was published in 1601, with Burre's name on the title page. In the 1601 Quarto version, the play was set in Florence. The play was next printed in Jonson's 1616 folio, with the setting being moved to London

The play's contemporary popularity is attested by such quick publication; although there are few records of performance, it presumably stayed in the King's Men's repertory until the theatres closed in 1642.

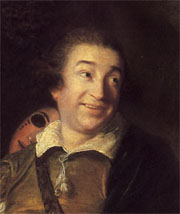
Portrait of David Garrick as Kitely by Joshua Reynolds

== Later performances ==
Gerard Langbaine reports that the play was revived by the King's Company in 1675. The play remained vivid enough in memory for John Rich to revive it at Lincoln's Inn Fields in 1725. However, it was not until David Garrick revived the play with substantial alterations in 1751 that the play regained currency on the English stage. Garrick's revisions served to focus attention on Kitely's jealousy; he both trimmed lines from the other plots and added a scene in which he attempts to elicit information from Cob while hiding his jealousy. The scene was a favourite, praised by Arthur Murphy and others; Kitely became one of Garrick's signature roles, and the play was never long out of his repertory.

The play declined in popularity in the last quarter of the century, in large part because it was seen as a Garrick vehicle. George Frederick Cooke revived the play at Covent Garden. Elizabeth Inchbald lauded the performance, calling Cooke's Kitely the equal of Garrick's. Cooke had mixed success with the play, though; it failed in Edinburgh in 1808. After 1803, Cooke may have alternated with Kemble in the title role for productions at Covent Garden.

Thereafter, the play has been subject to tentative revivals, none of which have established it as viable for modern repertory. Edmund Kean played Kitely in an unsuccessful 1816 production; his performance was praised by William Hazlitt. William Charles Macready essayed the role at the Haymarket Theatre in 1838; Robert Browning attended and approved the performance, but the play did not figure prominently in Macready's repertory.

Perhaps the most unusual revival occurred in 1845, when Charles Dickens and his friends mounted a benefit production. Aided by Macready, Dickens took the faintly Dickensian role of Bobadill; George Cruikshank was Cob; John Forster played Kitely. The production went off well enough to be repeated three or four times over the next two years. Bulwer-Lytton wrote a poem as prologue for an 1847 production; in addition to Browning, Tennyson and John Payne Collier attended.

Ben Iden Payne produced the play in Manchester in 1909, and again in Stratford for the Jonson tercentenary in 1937. The later production received much more favourable reviews.

John Caird directed the play during the inaugural season of the Swan Theatre in 1986.

== Plot and style ==
In general outline, this play follows Latin models quite closely. In the main plot, a gentleman named Kno'well, concerned for his son's moral development, attempts to spy on his son, a typical city gallant; however, his espionage is continually subverted by the servant, Brainworm, whom he employs for this purpose. These types are clearly slightly Anglicized versions of ancient types of Greek New Comedy, namely the senex, the son, and the slave. In the subplot, a merchant named Kitely suffers intense jealousy, fearing that his wife is cuckolding him with some of the wastrels brought to his home by his brother-in-law, Wellbred. The characters of these two plots are surrounded by various "humorous" characters, all in familiar English types: the irascible soldier, country gull, pretentious pot-poets, surly water-bearer, and avuncular judge all make an appearance. The play works through a series of complications which culminate when the justice, Clement, hears and decides all of the characters' various grievances, exposing each of them as based in humour, misperception, or deceit.

Jonson's purpose is delineated in the prologue he wrote for the folio version. These lines, which have justly been taken as applying to Jonson's comic theory in general, are especially appropriate to this play. He promises to present "deeds, and language, such as men do use:/ And persons, such as comedy would choose,/ When she would show an Image of the times,/ And sport with human follies, not with crimes." The play follows out this implicit rejection of the romantic comedy of his peers. It sticks quite carefully to the Aristotelian unities; the plot is a tightly woven mesh of act and reaction; the scenes a genial collection of depictions of everyday life in a large Renaissance city.

== Characters ==
- Kno’well, an old gentleman
- Edward Kno’well, his son
- Brainworm, his servant
- Master Stephen, a country gull
- George Downright, a squire
- Wellbred, his half-brother
- Justice Clement, an old magistrate
- Roger Formal, his clerk
- Thomas Kitely, a merchant
- Dame Kitely, his wife
- Mistress Bridget, his sister
- Master Matthew, the town gull
- Thomas Cash, Kitely’s man
- Oliver Cob, a water-bearer
- Tib, his wife
- Captain Bobadill, a Paul’s man

== History ==
Critics of the nineteenth century tended to credit Jonson with the introduction of "humour" comedy into English literature. It is now well known, only that George Chapman's An Humorous Day's Mirth preceded Jonson's play by a year or more, but that Jonson himself was not especially intrigued by the trope of "humours." Since only Kitely is dominated by a "humour" as Jonson defined it in Every Man Out of His Humour, it seems more likely that Jonson was using a contemporary taste aroused by Chapman to draw interest to his play, which became his first indisputable hit.

Jonson revised the play for the 1616 folio, where it was the first play presented. The most significant change was in the location. The 1598 edition was set in a vaguely identified Florence. Even in the original version, the background details were English; the revision formalises this fact by giving the characters English names and replacing the vaguely English details with specific references to London places.

The folio also gives a cast list for the original 1598 production. After Shakespeare, the main players are given in the following order: Richard Burbage, Augustine Phillips, John Heminges, Henry Condell, Thomas Pope, William Sly, Christopher Beeston, William Kempe, and John Duke. (Kempe would leave the company the next year, for his famous morris dance from London to Norwich.)

In 1599, Jonson wrote what would prove to be a much less popular sequel, Every Man out of His Humour.

The play was revived around 1670; Sackville provided a verse epilogue in which Jonson himself appeared as a ghost. David Garrick brought a revised version to the stage in 1751; the changes he made served chiefly to focus attention on the part of Kitely, which he played. The largest change was an entirely new scene featuring only Kitely and his wife, in which Kitely attempts to hide his jealousy. The production featured a prologue by William Whitehead and proved popular enough for many revivals. However, as critics near the end of the eighteenth century noted, the play's popularity arose more from Garrick than from Jonson; the play fell from regular use, with the rest of Jonson's comedies, by the beginning of the nineteenth century.
