= William Sly =

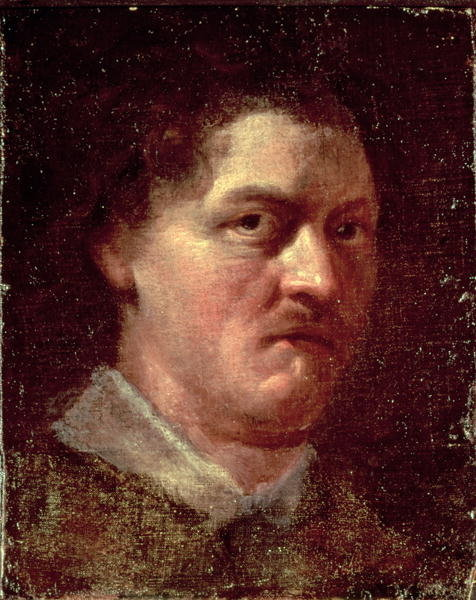
Actor, possibly William Sly, by unknown artist. Dulwich Picture Gallery, London

William Sly (died August 1608) was an English actor in English Renaissance theatre, a colleague of William Shakespeare and Richard Burbage in the Lord Chamberlain's Men and the King's Men.

== Biography ==
Nothing is known of Sly's early life. He enters the historical record by playing Porrex in the c. 1591 production of the play The Seven Deadly Sins (likely written by Richard Tarleton), along with Augustine Phillips, Thomas Pope, Richard Cowley, and George Bryan, all future colleagues in the Lord Chamberlain's Men. (That production was performed by a combination of personnel from the Lord Strange's Men and the Admiral's Men.) He is generally thought to have been with the Lord Chamberlain's Men at their re-formed start in 1594, probably at first as a hired man; he may have become a sharer in the company when George Bryan retired, c. 1597, though this is uncertain.

Sly is mentioned in Henslowe's diary between October 1594 and January 1595. He bought a jewel in a white setting from Henslowe and was paying him back in installments during this period. Henslowe recorded 8 separate repayments made by Sly.

Sly is included in the troupe's surviving cast lists for the next few years, for Every Man in His Humour (1598), Every Man Out of His Humour (1599), and Sejanus (1603) – all three by Ben Jonson. When the Lord Chamberlain's Men became the King's Men in May 1603, Sly was one of the sharers. He, along with a few other of the King's Men including Burbage, played himself in the brief Induction to Marston's The Malcontent, as indicated by the published version of the play. This scene showed him quoting one of Osric's lines in Hamlet, suggesting that he played that character.

In 1605, Sly became a shareholder in the Globe Theatre; in the same year he was one of the executors of Augustine Phillips's will. He was also one of the shareholders in the Blackfriars Theatre when the King's Men took it over in August 1608, but died soon after, his potential portion being divided among the other sharers. On 16 August 1608, he was buried in St. Leonard's Church in Shoreditch.

In his last will and testament, Sly left his share in the Globe to fellow actor Robert Browne; he left a large sum, £40, to a James Saunder or Sands, who might have been a boy player in The Seven Deadly Sins nearly two decades before. Further, he left his sword and hat to Cuthbert Burbage.
