= Henry Condell =

English actor (1576–1627)

Henry Condell (bapt. 5 September 1576 – December 1627) was a British actor in the King's Men, the playing company for which William Shakespeare wrote. With John Heminges, he was instrumental in preparing and editing the First Folio, the collected plays of Shakespeare, published in 1623.

== Life and career ==
Condell's early life is obscure. It appears that he may have been from East Anglia, as his will mentions 'my Cosen Gilder late of newe Buckenham’. According to Edmond:

The only Henry Condell so far discovered at a suitable date in that part of England was the son of a Robert Condell of St Peter Mancroft, Norwich, a fishmonger, and his wife, Joan, née Yeomans, of New Buckenham, a market town not far from Norwich. Henry Condell, presumably their son, was baptized at St Peter on 5 September 1576.

Traditionally, he is associated with the "Harry" who appears in the cast list for Richard Tarlton's The Seven Deadly Sins, but this identification is little more than conjecture. If the connection is true, then Condell was an actor as early as 1590, acting in Lord Strange's Men alongside John Heminges and Augustine Phillips. Condell was definitely in London by 24 October 1596, when he married, at St Laurence Pountney, Elizabeth Smart (d.1635), the only child of John Smart of the Strand, gentleman. They settled in St Mary Aldermanbury, the parish in which Heminges lived. Condell, like Heminges, served as churchwarden in that church. Nine children were baptized there, born between 1599 and 1614, of whom only three survived to adulthood: Elizabeth (baptized 26 October 1606), who married Herbert Finch; Henry (baptized 6 May 1610, died 1630); and William (baptized 26 May 1611).

Details of Condell's mature life, as is usual for Renaissance actors, are few. His status within the Lord Chamberlain's and King's companies appears to have been high; in official communications he is generally listed shortly after Burbage and Heminges. Actors' wills indicate that he was close to at least some of his colleagues in the company. Shakespeare and Phillips bequeathed him money for mourning rings; Nicholas Tooley and Alexander Cooke named him as trustee for their estates. Condell prospered enough in his profession to purchase a country home at Fulham in Middlesex and other property, including an estate called Brockhampton in Snowshill, Gloucestershire. The indentures recording the latter purchase contain the only known example of Condell's signature or handwriting apart from his last will.

In addition to Every Man in His Humour (1598) and Every Man Out of His Humour (1599), Condell is known to have performed in four more of Jonson's plays: Sejanus (1603), Volpone (1605), The Alchemist (1610), and Catiline (1611). He was the original Cardinal in John Webster's The Duchess of Malfi (c. 1613). And he was listed in eight of the cast lists that were added to the second Beaumont and Fletcher folio of 1679:

- Bonduca
- The Captain
- The Humorous Lieutenant
- The Knight of Malta
- The Loyal Subject
- The Mad Lover
- The Queen of Corinth
- Valentinian

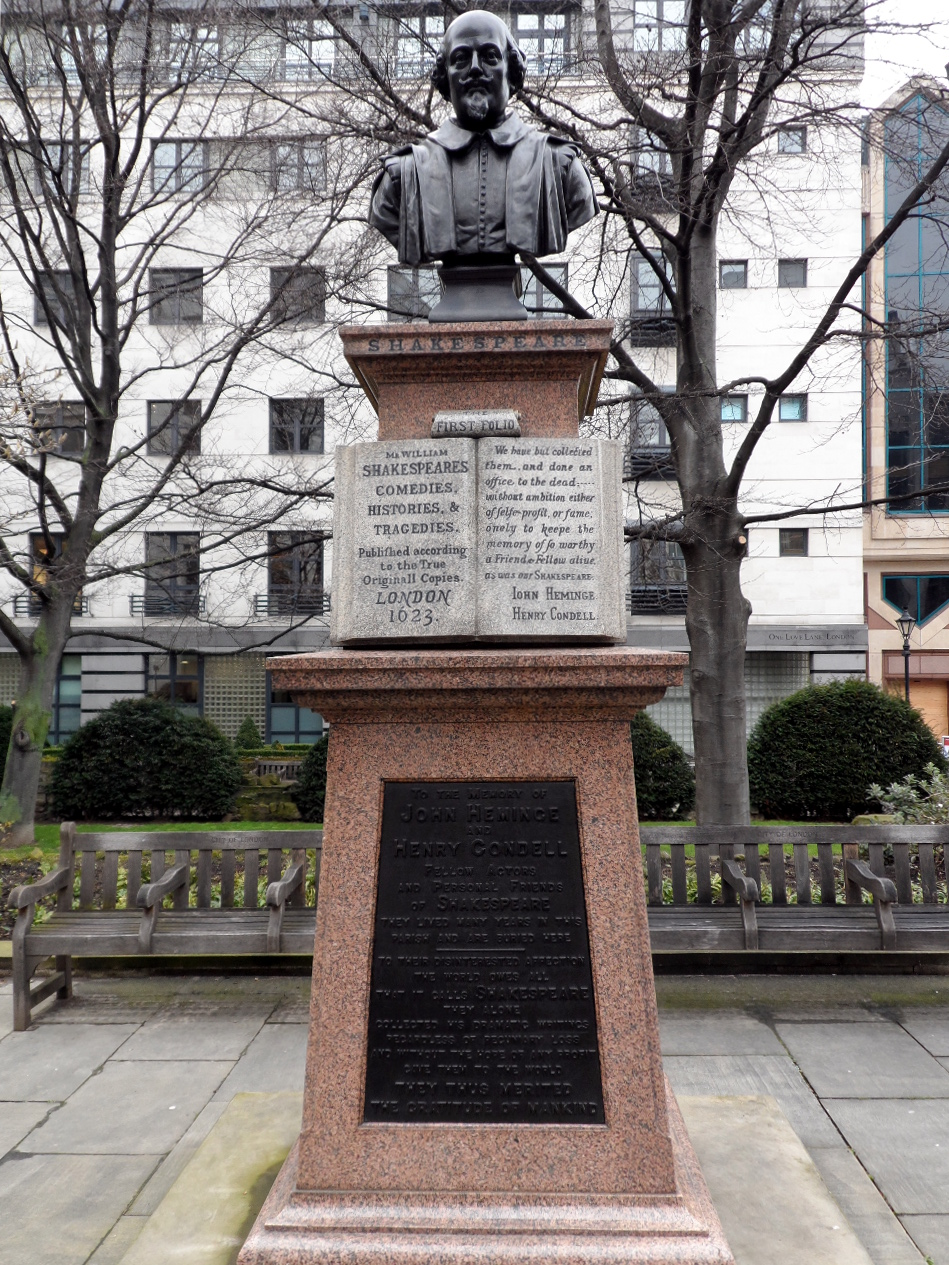
John Heminges and Henry Condell Memorial in London, commemorating their work with Shakespeare

Condell appears to have ended his stage career around 1619. He signed each of the nine sheets of his last will and testament on 13 December 1627. He died at Fulham aged 51, and was buried at St Mary Aldermanbury on 29 December 1627. His widow, Elizabeth, was buried there on 3 October 1635.

Condell left an extensive estate, including shares in the Globe and Blackfriars Theatres.

== Fictional portrayals ==
In the 2016 sitcom Upstart Crow, Henry Condell is played by Dominic Coleman. In the 2011 film Anonymous he is played by Mark Rylance.
