= Comedy of humours =

Genre of dramatic comedy

The comedy of humours is a genre of dramatic comedy that focuses on a character or range of characters, each of whom exhibits overriding traits or 'humours' that dominate their personality, desires and conduct. This comic technique may be found in Aristophanes, but the English playwrights Ben Jonson and George Chapman popularised the genre in the closing years of the sixteenth century. In the later half of the seventeenth century, it was combined with the comedy of manners in Restoration comedy.

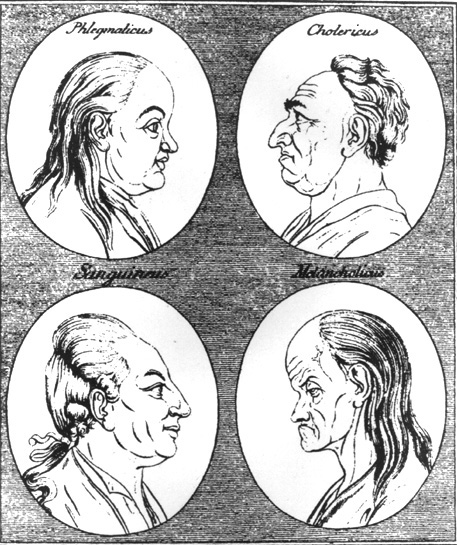
The four 'humours' or temperaments (Clockwise from top right; choleric; melancholic; sanguine; phlegmatic).

In Jonson’s Every Man in His Humour (acted 1598), which made this type of play popular, all the words and acts of Kitely are controlled by an overpowering suspicion that his wife is unfaithful; George Downright, a country squire, must be "frank" above all things; the country gull in town determines his every decision by his desire to "catch on" to the manners of the city gallant.

In his Induction to Every Man out of His Humour (1599). Jonson explains this character formula:

Some one peculiar quality
Doth so possess a man, that it doth draw
All his affects, his spirits, and his powers,
In their confluctions, all to run one way.

The comedy of humours owes something to earlier vernacular comedy but also to a desire to imitate the classical comedy of Plautus and Terence. It combatted the competing romantic comedy, as developed by William Shakespeare. The satiric purpose of the comedy of humours and its realistic method led to more serious character studies with Jonson’s 1610 play The Alchemist. The name derives from the then-prevalent concept of bodily humours that controlled emotional disposition, but were also associated with psychological characteristics; the result was a system that was quite subtle in its capacity for describing types of personality.
