= Augustine Phillips =

16th-century English actor and theatre sharer

Augustine Phillips (died May 1605) was an English actor in the Elizabethan theatre who performed in troupes with Edward Alleyn and William Shakespeare. He was one of the first generation of English actors to achieve wealth and a degree of social status by means of his trade.

== Biography ==
Phillips first enters the historical record as a member of the amalgamation of Lord Strange's Men and the Admiral's Men that performed The Seven Deadly Sins (perhaps by Richard Tarlton) between 1590 and 1592. In the surviving "plot" of this performance, Phillips is assigned the role of Sardanapalus; he is one of the few actors not required to play a double role. He is named in the touring warrant issued to Strange's Men in 1592; after the death of their patron Ferdinando Stanley he joined the new Lord Chamberlain's Men, presumably as a sharer.

Phillips remained with the company through its change to the King's Men and to his death in 1605. Little is known with certainty of his roles with the company, except that he was probably already mature when the company assembled. He appears in the cast lists for Ben Jonson's Every Man in His Humour (1598), Every Man Out of His Humour (1599), and Sejanus (1603). He may be the author of a jig, Phillips His Slipper, entered for publishing in the Stationers' Register in 1595.

He was one of the six sharers in the Globe Theatre when it was built in 1598–9, with a one-eighth share. Over time this made him a comparatively wealthy man, at least as far as Elizabethan actors were concerned. Like Shakespeare, Phillips lived for many years near his occupation in Southwark, in Paris Garden near the Swan Theatre, and in Aldgate; but by the time of his death he owned a house in Mortlake, in Surrey.

In 1601, he was the representative of the company called to testify before the Privy Council about their involvement with the rebellion of the Earl of Essex; the Chamberlain's Men had been paid by supporters of the Earl to perform Shakespeare's Richard II before the abortive coup. Phillips' testimony seems to have assuaged whatever anger the court may have felt towards the players; they were not punished, and indeed played for Elizabeth at Whitehall on 24 February 1601, the night before Essex was executed. (Phillips testified that the Lord Chamberlain's Men had played at the request of Essex's supporters, specifically because they were offered 40 shillings more than their normal fee. This might indicate that Phillips had a role in keeping the financial accounts of the company.)

In August 1604, Augustine Phillips and John Heminges and their King's Men fellows served at Somerset House as grooms in the household of the Spanish ambassador Juan Fernández de Velasco y Tovar, 5th Duke of Frías. The actors, possibly including William Shakespeare, may have employed simply as extra hired help in magnificent households appointed for the ambassadors, and were not necessarily the recipients of special royal favour.

== Family ==
The evidence suggests a life deeply intertwined with the theatre. He was a stepbrother of his fellow King's Man Thomas Pope, and his sister married another actor, Robert Gough.

Phillips's daughters Magdalen and Rebecca were baptized in the parish of St. Saviour's in Southwark in 1594 and 1596 respectively. A son, Augustine or Austen, was baptized there in 1601 but buried three years later. Phillips's will, which was signed on 4 May 1605 and probated on 13 May 1605, mentions two other daughters, Anne and Elizabeth, and his wife Anne, plus brothers, sisters, and other relations of a large family. The will includes a number of interesting and revealing bequests:

- a silver bowl worth £5 to each of the executors, John Heminges, Richard Burbage, and William Sly;
- a 30-shilling gold piece each to Shakespeare, Henry Condell, and Christopher Beeston (Beeston is described as Phillips's "servant;" he was almost certainly a former apprentice);
- 20 shillings in gold each to Lawrence Fletcher, Robert Armin, Alexander Cooke, Richard Cowley, and Nicholas Tooley;
- 40s. to his apprentice James Sands, along with a cittern, a bandora, and a lute, all pending the "expiration of his term of years in his indenture of apprenticehood;"
- 40s. to his "late apprentice" Samuel Gilburne, plus Phillips's "mouse-colored" velvet hose, his black taffeta suit and white taffeta doublet, his purple cloak, his sword and dagger, and his bass viol;
- and £5 to be split among the hired men "of the company which I am of."

The musical instruments obviously imply that Phillips was a musician, and as such he was probably involved in the dramatic music used in productions throughout his career.
