= Robert Gough (actor) =

English actor

Robert Gough (born circa 1580 – died 1624), also Goughe or Goffe, was an English actor who took female parts in Shakespeare's plays. He was the father of actor Alexander Gough.

== Biography ==
Gough was one of the boy actors in Shakespeare's plays, appearing twenty-third in the list of actors' names prefixed to the 1623 folio. He resided in Southwark, London; was living in Hill's Rents in 1604, in Samson's Rents in 1605–6, and in Austin's Rents in 1612, where he seems to have stayed until 1622, if not to his death. His death date was found in the monthly account in the register book of St. Saviour's church: "19 Feb., 1624, Robert Goffe, a player, buried."

In 1591, as a boy actor, he took the female character of Aspatia in ‘Sardanapalus,’ a portion of a piece by Richard Tarlton called ‘The Seconde Parte of the Seven Deadlie Sinns,’ of which ‘The Platt’ is all that survives, and is to be found among the manuscripts (No. xix.) at Dulwich College, printed in Steevens's additions to Malone's ‘Historical Account,’ and in Collier's ‘English Dramatic Poetry.’

He almost certainly played the role of Juliet opposite the 28-year-old Richard Burbage in the first stage performances of Romeo and Juliet circa 1595.

In 1603 he had a legacy from Thomas Pope, whom Malone assumes to have probably been his master, of half of the testator's wearing apparel and arms.

On 13 February 1602 he married Elizabeth Phillips, the sister of Augustine Phillips, the actor, who received from her brother a testamentary bequest of 10l "of lawfull money of England." Under the name Robert Goffe, Goughe is a witness to Phillips's will, which is dated 4 May 1605.

In 1611 he played the Usurping Tyrant in the ‘Second Maiden's Tragedy.’ If he had been 11 in his first role as Aspatia, and had played Juliet at around age 15, then his Usurping Tyrant role would have been played at age 31.

== Children of Robert Gough ==
Elizabeth Goffe or Gough, daughter of Robert, a player, was baptised on 30 May 1605, Nicholas Goffe on 24 November 1608, Dorothaye Goffe on 10 February 1610, buried on 12 January 1612, and Alexander Goffe on 7 August 1614, all at St. Saviour's Church.

The last-named, also an actor until the closing of the theatres, published in 1652 the Widow, by Ben Jonson, Fletcher, and Middleton, and according to Wright's Historia Histrionica was "the woman actor at Black Friars", who, when in Cromwell's time the actors played privately in the houses of noblemen, "used to be the jackal, and give notice of time and place."
