= Blackfriars Theatre =

Former theatre in London

Coordinates: 51°30′46″N 0°06′09″W

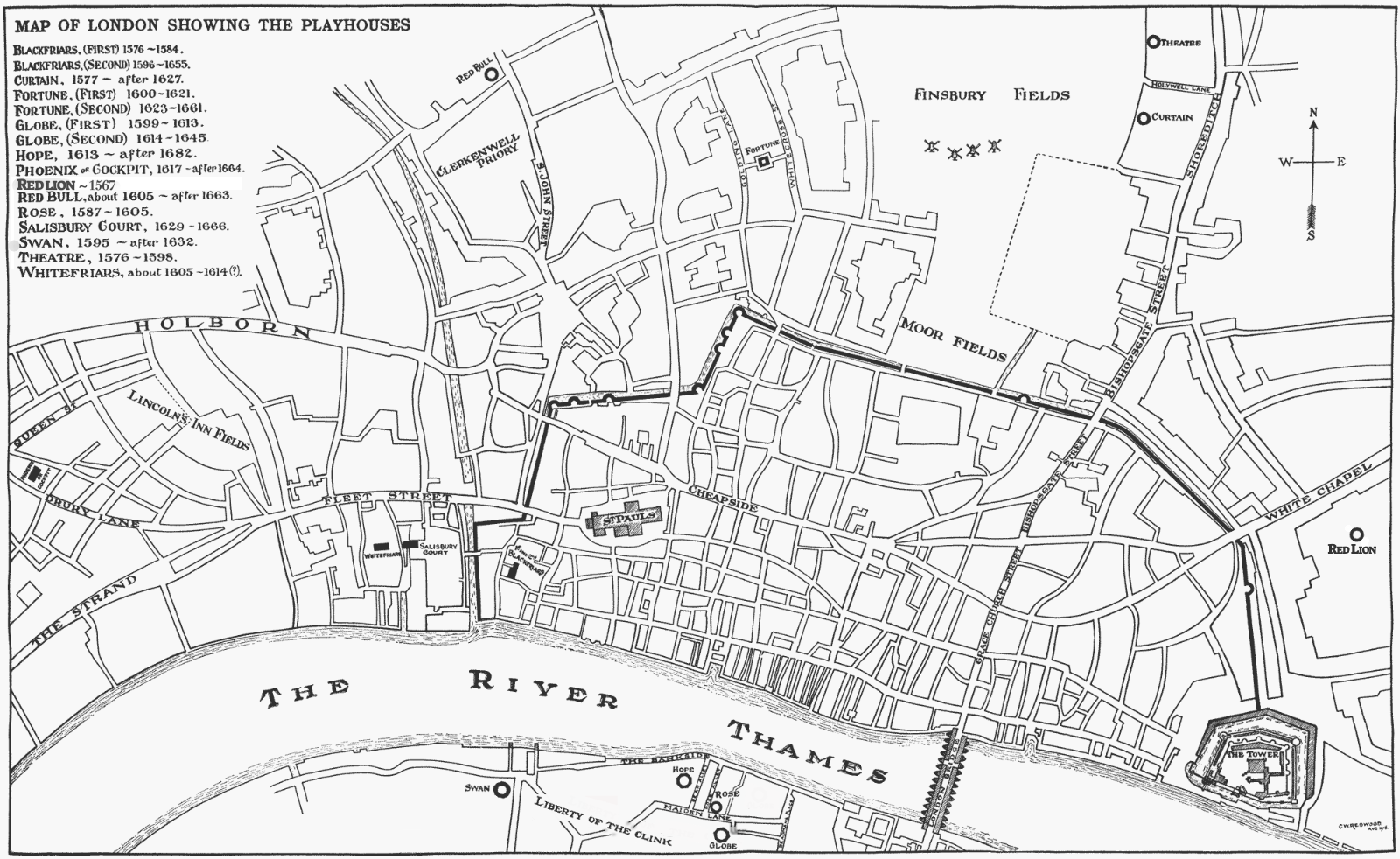
Theatre Map of early modern London. Blackfriars Theatre is to the south-west of St Paul's Cathedral

Blackfriars Theatre was the name given to two separate theatres located in the former Blackfriars Dominican priory in the City of London during the Renaissance. The first theatre began as a venue for the Children of the Chapel Royal, child actors associated with the Queen's chapel choirs, and who from 1576 to 1584 staged plays in the vast hall of the former monastery. The second theatre dates from the purchase of the upper part of the priory and another building by James Burbage in 1596, which included the Parliament Chamber on the upper floor that was converted into the playhouse. The Children of the Chapel played in the theatre beginning in the autumn of 1600 until the King's Men took over in 1608. They successfully used it as their winter playhouse until all the theatres were closed in 1642 when the English Civil War began. In 1666, the entire area was destroyed in the Great Fire of London.

== First theatre ==
Blackfriars Theatre was built on the grounds of the former Dominican monastery. The monastery was located between the Thames and Ludgate Hill within London proper. The black robes worn by members of this order lent the neighbourhood, and theatres, their name. In the pre-Reformation Tudor years, the site was used not only for religious but also for political functions, such as the annulment trial of Catherine of Aragon and Henry VIII which, some eight decades later, would be reenacted in the same room by Shakespeare's company. After Henry's expropriation of monastic property, the monastery became the property of the crown; control of the property was granted to Sir Thomas Cawarden, Master of the Revels. Cawarden used part of the monastery as Revels offices; other parts he sold or leased to the neighbourhood's wealthy residents, including Lord Cobham and John Cheke. After Cawarden's death in 1559, the property was sold by Lady Cawarden to Sir William More. In 1576, Richard Farrant, then Master of Windsor Chapel leased part of the former buttery from More in order to stage plays. As often in the theatrical practice of the time, this commercial enterprise was justified by the convenient fiction of royal necessity; Farrant claimed to need the space for his child choristers to practice plays for the Queen, but he also staged plays for paying audiences. The theatre was small, perhaps 46 feet (14 m) long and 25 feet (7.6 m) wide, and admission, compared to public theatres, expensive (six pence in the gallery, rising in stages to three shillings for a seat in a box close to the stage); both these factors limited attendance at the theatre to a fairly select group of well-to-do gentry and nobles.

For his playing company, Farrant combined his Windsor children with the Children of the Chapel Royal, then directed by William Hunnis. On Farrant's death in 1580, Hunnis took on John Newman as a partner and they subleased the property from Farrant's widow, putting up a £100 bond on the promise to promptly pay the rent and to make needed repairs. But the venture did not go well financially, which put Farrant's widow in jeopardy of defaulting on the rent to More. In November 1583, Farrant brought suit against Hunnis and Newman for default on the bond. To escape a suit by her or More, Hunnis and Newman transferred their sublease to Henry Evans, a Welsh scrivener and theatrical aficionado. This unauthorised assignment of the sublease gave More an excuse to bring suit to retake possession of the property, but Evans used legal delays and finally escaped legal action by selling the sublease to Edward de Vere, 17th Earl of Oxford, sometime after Michaelmas Term (November) of 1583, who then gave it to his secretary, the writer John Lyly.

As proprietor of the playhouse, Lyly installed Evans as the manager of the new company of Oxford's Boys, composed of the Children of the Chapel and the Children of Paul's, and turned his talents to play writing. Lyly's Campaspe was performed at Blackfriars and subsequently at Court on New Year's Day 1584; likewise, his Sapho and Phao was produced first at Blackfriars on Shrove Tuesday and then at court on 3 March, with Lyly listed as the payee for both Court appearances. In November 1583, Hunnis, still Master of the Chapel Children, successfully petitioned the Queen to increase the stipend to house, feed, and clothe the company. More finally obtained a legal judgement voiding the original lease at the end of Easter Term (June) of 1584, thereby ending the First Blackfriars Playhouse after eight years and postponing the performance of Lyly's third play, Gallathea.

== Second theatre ==
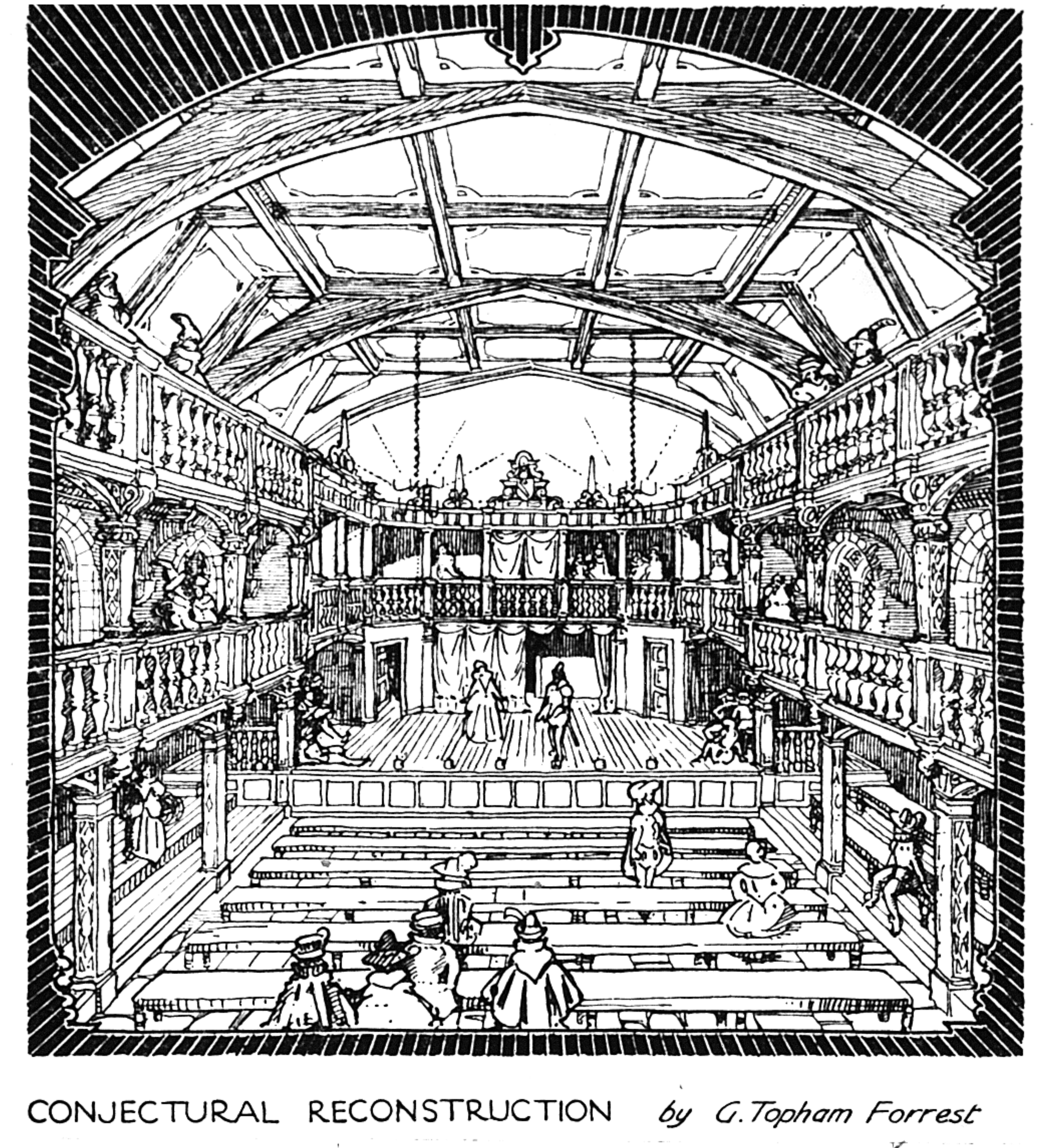
Conjectural reconstruction of the second Blackfriars Theatre from contemporary documents.

The second Blackfriars was an indoor theatre built elsewhere on the property at the instigation of James Burbage, father of Richard Burbage, and impresario of the Lord Chamberlain's Men. In 1596, Burbage purchased, for £600, the frater of the former priory and rooms below. This large space, perhaps 100 feet (30 m) long and 50 wide (15 metres), with high ceilings allowed Burbage to construct two galleries, substantially increasing potential attendance. He employed carpenter Peter Street for the work. (Later, in 1599, Richard Burbage was to engage Street for his ambitious Globe Theatre project.) The nature of Burbage's modifications to his purchase is not clear, and the many contemporary references to the theatre do not offer a precise picture of its design. Once fitted for playing, the space may have been about 69 feet (21 m) long and 46 feet (14 m) wide (20 by 14 metres), including tiring areas. There were at least two and possibly three galleries, and perhaps a number of stage boxes adjacent to the stage. Estimates of its capacity have varied from below 600 to almost 1000, depending on the number of galleries and boxes. Perhaps as many as ten spectators would have encumbered the stage.

As Burbage built, however, a petition from the residents of the wealthy neighbourhood and led by Lady Elizabeth Russell, persuaded the Privy Council to forbid playing there. Referring to "divers both honorable and others then inhabiting the said precinct" and "what inconveniences were likely to fall upon them from a common playhouse" the letter was signed even by Lord Hunsdon, patron of Burbage's company, and by Richard Field, the Blackfriars printer and hometown neighbour of William Shakespeare. The company was absolutely forbidden to perform there. Three years later, Richard Burbage was able to lease the property to Henry Evans, who had been among those ejected more than fifteen years earlier. Evans entered a partnership with Nathaniel Giles, Hunnis's successor at the Chapel Royal. They used the theatre for a commercial enterprise with a group called the Children of the Chapel, which combined the choristers of the chapel with other boys, many taken up from local grammar schools under colour of Giles's warrant to provide entertainment for the Queen. The dubious legality of these dramatic impressments led to a challenge from a father in 1600; however, this method brought the company some of its most famous actors, including Nathaniel Field and Salmon Pavy. The residents did not protest at this use, probably because of perceived social differences between the adult and child companies.

While it housed this company, Blackfriars was the site of an explosion of innovative drama and staging. Together with its competitor, Paul's Children, the Blackfriars company produced plays by a number of the most talented young dramatists of Jacobean literature, among them Thomas Middleton, Ben Jonson, George Chapman, and John Marston. Chapman and Jonson wrote almost exclusively for Blackfriars in this period, while Marston began with Paul's but switched to Blackfriars, in which he appears to have been a sharer, by around 1605. In the latter half of the decade, the company at Blackfriars premiered plays by Francis Beaumont (The Knight of the Burning Pestle) and John Fletcher (The Faithful Shepherdess) that, although failures in their first production, marked the first significant appearance of these two dramatists, whose work would profoundly affect early Stuart drama. The new plays of all these playwrights deliberately pushed the accepted boundaries of personal and social satire, of violence on stage, and of sexual frankness. These plays appear to have attracted members of a higher social class than was the norm at the Bankside and Shoreditch theatres, and the admission price (sixpence for a cheap seat) probably excluded the poorer patrons of the amphitheatres. Prefaces and internal references speak of gallants and Inns of Court men, who came not only to see a play but also, of course, to be seen; the private theatres sold seats on the stage itself.

The Blackfriars playhouse was also the source of other innovations which would profoundly change the nature of English commercial staging: it was among the first commercial theatrical enterprises to rely on artificial lighting, and it featured music between acts, a practice which the induction to Marston's The Malcontent (1604) indicates was not common in the public theatres at that time.

In the years around the turn of the century, the children's companies were something of a phenomenon; a reference in Hamlet to "little eyasses" suggests that even the adult companies felt threatened by them. By the later half of that decade, the fashion had changed somewhat. In 1608, Burbage's company (by this time, the King's Men) took possession of the theatre, which they still owned, this time without objections from the neighbourhood. There were originally seven sharers in the reorganised theatre: Richard Burbage, William Shakespeare, Henry Condell, John Heminges, and William Sly, all members of the King's Men, plus Cuthbert Burbage and Thomas Evans, agent for the theatre manager Henry Evans. This arrangement of shareholders (or "housekeepers) was similar to how the Globe Theatre was operated. Sly, however, died soon after the arrangement was made, and his share was divided among the other six.

After renovations, the King's Men began using the theatre for performances in 1609. Thereafter the King's Men played in Blackfriars for the seven months in winter, and at the Globe during the summer. Blackfriars appears to have brought in a little over twice the revenue of the Globe; the shareholders could earn as much as £13 from a single performance, apart from what went to the actors.

In the reign of Charles I, even Queen Henrietta Maria was in the Blackfriars audience. On 13 May 1634 she and her attendants saw a play by Philip Massinger; in late 1635 or early 1636 they saw Lodowick Carlell's Arviragus and Philicia, part 2; and they attended a third performance in May 1636.

During the reign of Charles I, the Blackfriars Theatre was likely the first stage in which the English public experienced women acting onstage. In the first half of the 17th century, women were still not allowed on the English stage. The English audience was first introduced to female actors by visiting foreign theatre companies, since women did act on stage on the continent. However, such foreign actresses were not welcomed by the English public. In November 1629, a French theatre company was allowed to make a guest appearance at the Blackfriars Theatre in London, during which the actresses were "hissed, booed and pippin-pelted from the stage". No native English actresses were able to perform until forty years after this.

The theatre closed at the onset of the English Civil War, and was demolished on 6 August 1655.

== Reconstructions ==
=== Blackfriars Playhouse ===
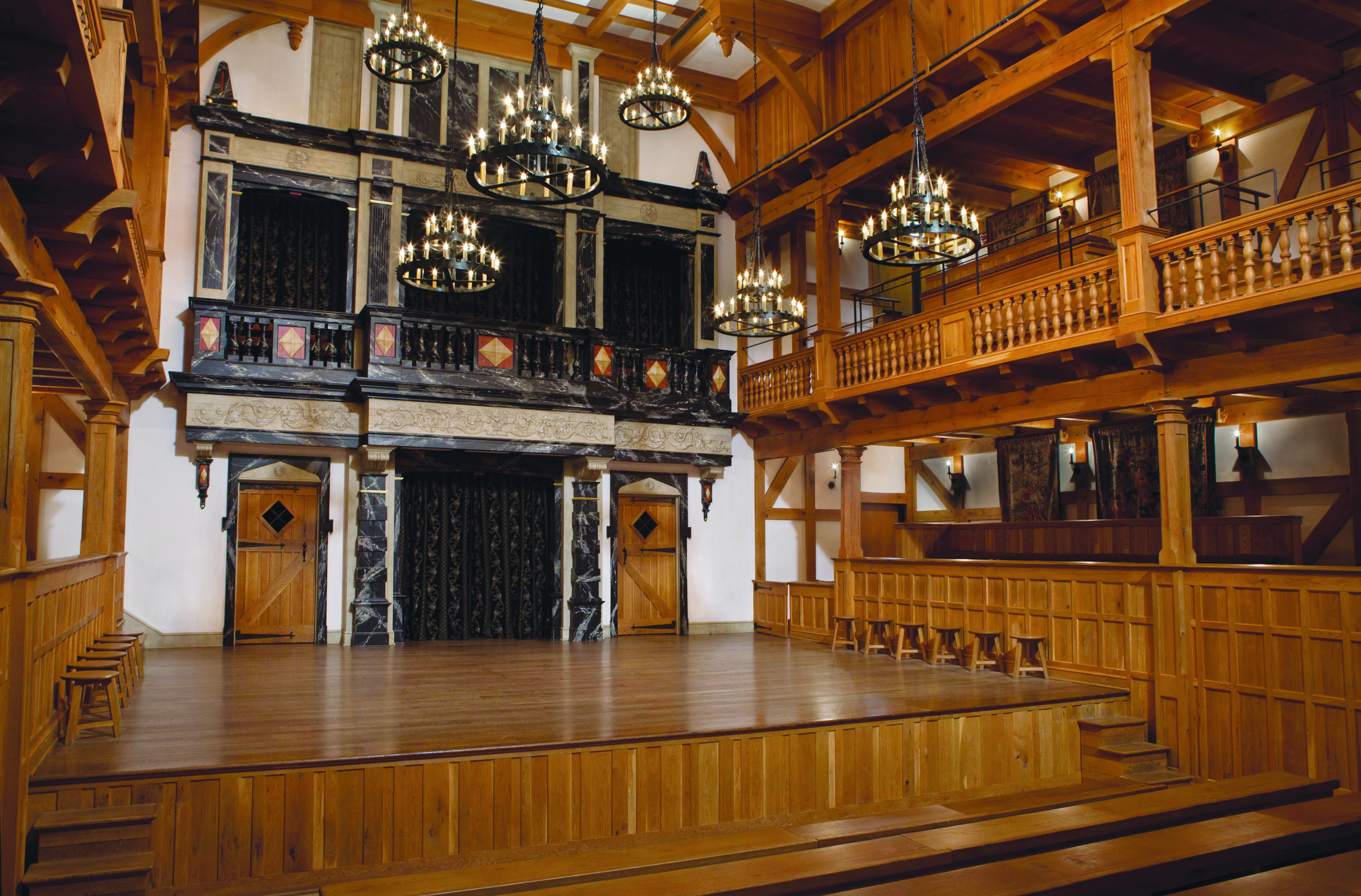
The American Shakespeare Center's Blackfriars Playhouse in Staunton, Virginia

The American Shakespeare Center's Blackfriars Playhouse in Staunton, Virginia, is a re-creation of a Jacobean theatre based on what is known of the original Blackfriars. Completed at a cost of $3.7 million, the 300-seat theatre opened in September 2001. Architect Tom McLaughlin based the design on plans for other 17th-century theatres, his own trips to England to view surviving halls of the period, Shakespeare's stage directions and other research and consultation. The lighting imitates that of the original Blackfriars.

=== Sam Wanamaker Playhouse ===
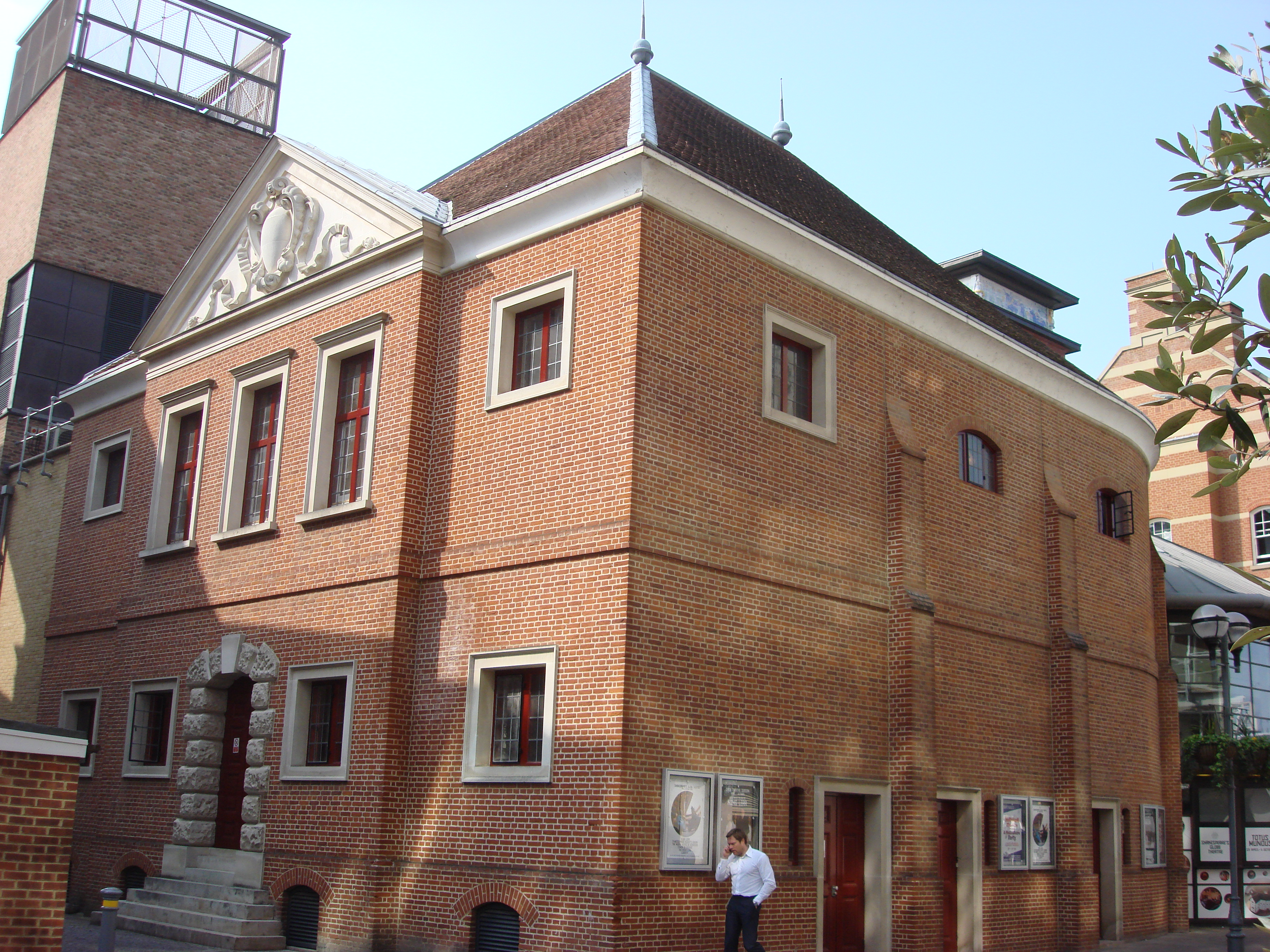
The Sam Wanamaker Playhouse on Bankside, London, adjoining Shakespeare's Globe

During the construction of Shakespeare's Globe, London, in the 1990s, the shell for an indoor theatre was built next door, to house a "simulacrum" of the Blackfriars Theatre. As no reliable plans of the Blackfriars are known, the plan for the new theatre was based on drawings found in the 1960s at Worcester College, Oxford, at first thought to date from the early 17th century, and to be the work of Inigo Jones. The shell was built to accommodate a theatre as specified by the drawings, and the planned name was the Inigo Jones Theatre. In 2005, the drawings were dated to 1660 and attributed to John Webb. They nevertheless represent the earliest known plan for an English theatre, and are thought to approximate the layout of the Blackfriars Theatre. Some features believed to be typical of earlier in the 17th century were added to the new theatre's design.

Completed at a cost of £7.5 million, the theatre opened as the Sam Wanamaker Playhouse in January 2014. Designed by Jon Greenfield, in collaboration with Allies and Morrison, it is an oak structure built inside the building's brick shell. The thrust stage is surmounted by a musicians' gallery, and the theatre has an ornately painted ceiling. The seating capacity is 340, with benches in a pit and two horse-shoe galleries, placing the audience close to the actors. Shutters around the first gallery admit artificial daylight. When the shutters are closed, lighting is provided by beeswax candles mounted in sconces, as well as on six height-adjustable chandeliers and even held by the actors.

== See also ==
- List of English Renaissance theatres
- Mermaid Theatre (1959), a modern theatre built on, or near the original site
