= Every Man out of His Humour =

Play

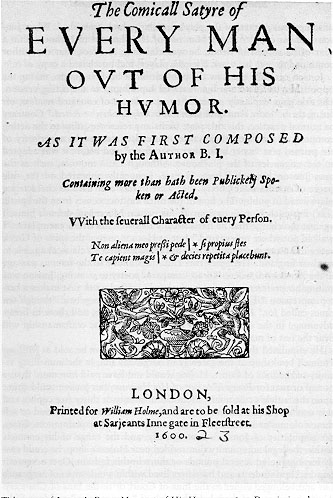
Title page of 1600 printing of Every Man out of His Humour.

Every Man out of His Humour (also spelled Humor in some early editions) is a satirical comedy play written by English playwright Ben Jonson, acted in 1599 by the Lord Chamberlain's Men.

== The play ==
The play is a conceptual sequel to his 1598 comedy Every Man in His Humour. It was much less successful on stage than its predecessor, though it was published in quarto three times in 1600 alone; it was also performed at Court on 8 January 1605.

The play was entered into the Register of the Stationers' Company on 8 April 1600 by the bookseller William Holme, who published the first quarto of the play soon after. Holmes issued a second quarto later that year, with the printing done by Peter Short. Yet a third quarto appeared in 1600, published by Nicholas Ling, the stationer who would issue the "bad quarto" of Hamlet three years later. W. W. Greg characterized Ling's Q3 as "A careless and ignorant reprint" of Q1.

Every Man Out contains an allusion to John Marston's Histriomastix in Act III, scene i, a play that was acted in the autumn of 1599; the clown character Clove speaks "fustian" in mimicry of Marston's style. This is one instance of Jonson's involvement in the War of the Theatres. Scholars have found references to Sir Walter Raleigh and Gabriel Harvey. The characters Fastidious Brisk and Carlo Buffone in Every Man Out—like Hedon and Anaides in Cynthia's Revels and Crispinus and Demetrius in The Poetaster—are representations of Marston and Thomas Dekker. The character Sogliardo, who Jonson includes in his general mockery of socially ambitious fools, is a country bumpkin, new to the city, who boasts of the coat of arms he has recently purchased, which, when he describes its colours, resembles a fool’s motley. Another character suggests Sogliardo should use the motto, "Not Without Mustard". This has been construed by some critics as a reference to William Shakespeare’s recently acquired coat of arms with its gold colour, and its motto, Non Sans Droit, which translates as "Not Without Right".

When the play was reprinted in Jonson's folio collection of 1616, a cast list of the original 1599 production was included. From this, it is known that the leading players were Richard Burbage, John Heminges, Henry Condell, Augustine Phillips, Thomas Pope, and William Sly. Shakespeare was not part of the production, though he had played in Every Man in His Humour the year before.

Every Man Out of His Humour includes several references to Shakespeare and his contemporaneous works: a mention of Justice Silence from Henry IV, Part 2—"this is a kinsman to Justice Silence" (V, ii) and two allusions to Julius Caesar, which help to date that play to 1599. "Et tu, Brute" occurs in V, iv of Every Man Out; in III, i appears "reason long since is fled to animals," a paraphrase of Shakespeare's line "O judgment, thou art fled to brutish beasts" in Julius Caesar, III, ii,104.

== See also ==
- Paul's walk
