= John Heminges and Henry Condell Memorial =

Memorial in London

Coordinates: 51°30′58.89″N 0°5′34.95″W

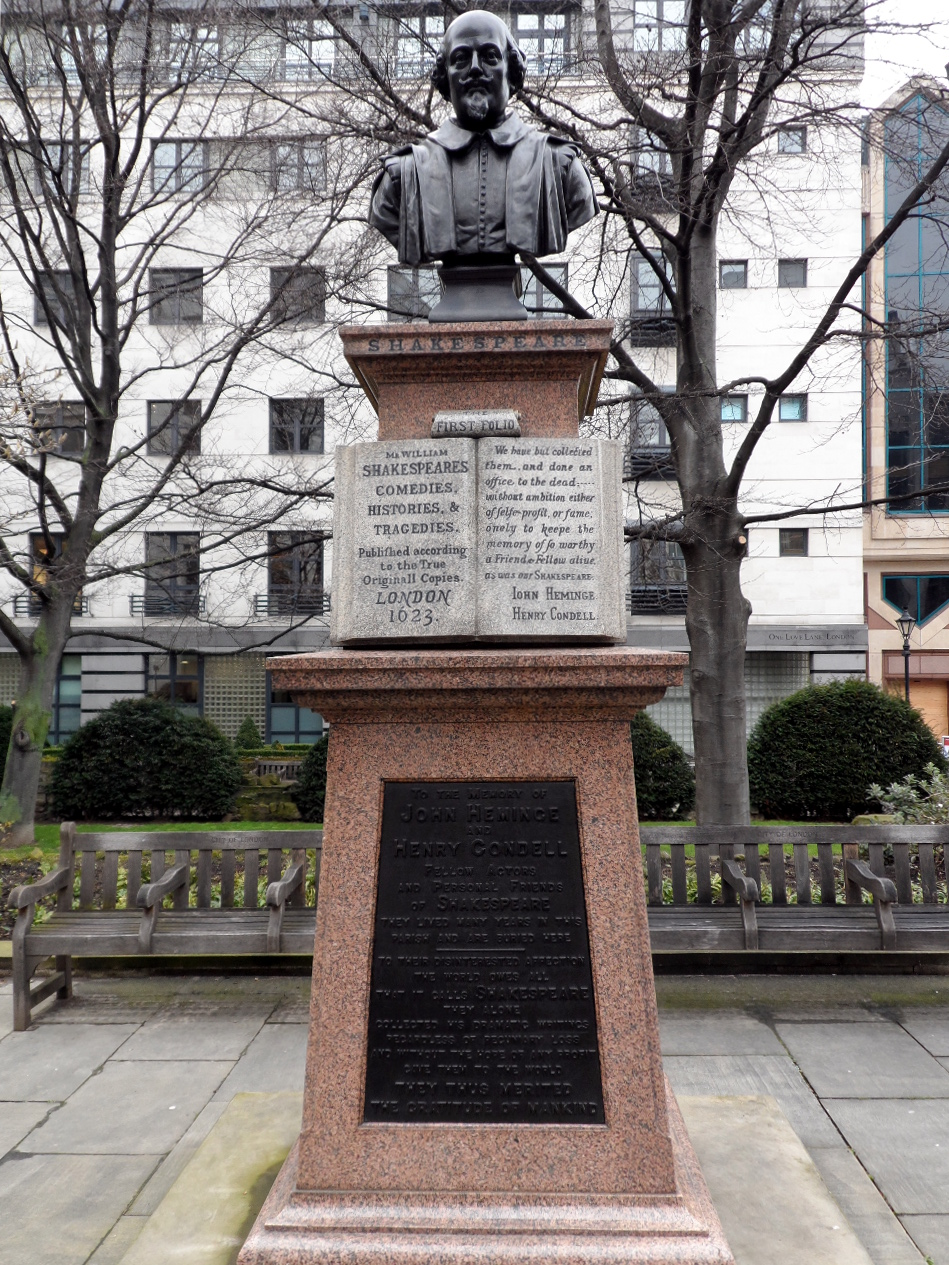
- Artist: C. J. Allen
- Year: 1895–1896
- Location: St Mary Aldermanbury old churchyard; City of London

The John Heminges and Henry Condell Memorial is a memorial to the actors John Heminges and Henry Condell – the editors of William Shakespeare's First Folio, published in 1623 – in the former churchyard of St Mary Aldermanbury on Love Lane, London EC2. The memorial is made from pink granite and is topped with a bust of Shakespeare by C. J. Allen, dated 1895.

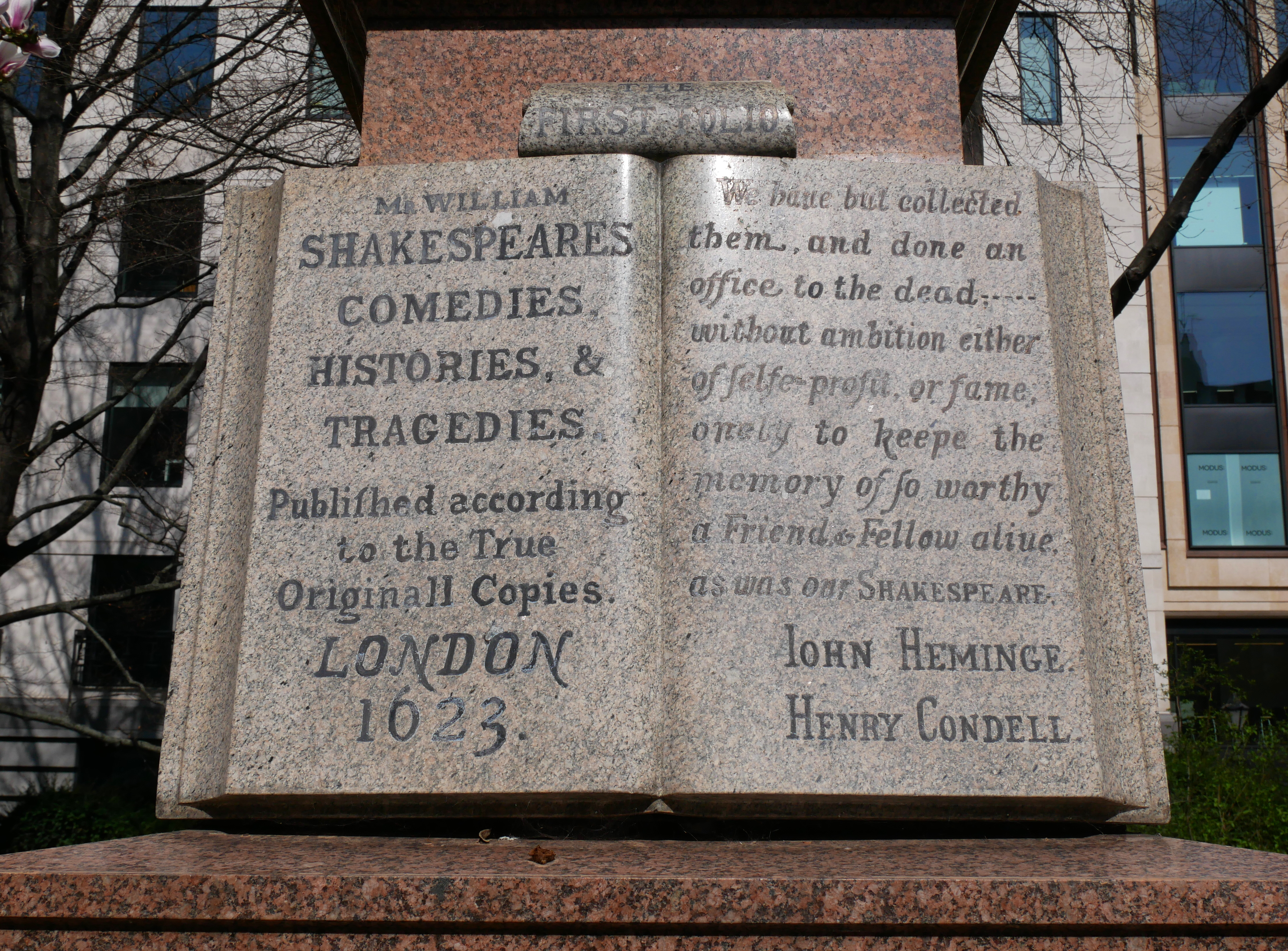
Epigraph on the memorial

The memorial was commissioned by Charles Clement Walker, manager of the Midlands Ironworks in Donington, Shropshire, and a Shakespeare enthusiast. C. J. Allen had previously exhibited a bust of Walker at the Royal Academy in 1894. His bust for this memorial is combines the features of what the patron regarded as the two most accepted likenesses of Shakespeare: the bust on his funerary monument in Stratford-upon-Avon and the Droeshout portrait on the frontispiece of the First Folio.

The memorial was unveiled on 15 July 1896, in a ceremony attended by the Lord Mayor of London, the American ambassador, the actor Sir Henry Irving and Lord Ronald Gower, an acquaintance of Walker's and the sculptor of a memorial to Shakespeare in Stratford.

The memorial falls under the present-day ecclesiastical parish of St Vedast Foster Lane, in the City of London deanery of the Diocese of London. It has been Grade II listed since 1972.
