= Alexander Cooke =

Actor

Alexander Cooke (died February 1614) was an actor in the King's Men and the Lord Chamberlain's Men, the acting companies of William Shakespeare, John Heminges and Richard Burbage.

Cooke was most likely introduced to the theatre by John Heminges, to whom he was apprenticed under the Grocer's Guild on 26 January 1597. While guild records state that his indenture was to last seven years, Cooke was not freed until 22 March 1609. Cooke bound Walter Haynes under the same guild on 28 March 1610.

Cooke's full name first appears in the plot for Ben Jonson's Sejanus His Fall (1603) in which he is listed as a "principle tragedian". This might indicate that he was a young actor in a prominent female role, perhaps Agrippina. He became a shareholder in the King's Men in 1604 when the number of shareholders was expanded to twelve. He was also cast in Volpone (1605), in which he may have been Lady Would-be; Jonson's The Alchemist (1610); Catiline (1611) and Beaumont and Fletcher's The Captain (c. 1612). Edmond Malone introduced the hypothesis, still current though far from certain, that Cooke as a boy actor originally played many of Shakespeare's principal female roles. Indeed, Cooke is listed as a principal player in the First Folio, indicating that he was involved in many of William Shakespeare's plays. Cooke acted until 1612 when he may have become ill. He wrote his will on 3 January 1614 and was buried inside St. Saviour's church, now Southwark Cathedral, on 25 February. Around the time of his death Cooke had resided in Goat Yard, in the parish of St. Saviour's, Southwark.

In his will, Cooke names John Heminges and Henry Condell as trustees of his children – his sons Francis (born in 1605) and Alexander (1614), and daughters Rebecca (1607) and Alice (1611). Cooke's wife acted as his executrix.

Alexander Cooke had a brother John; John Payne Collier speculated that this John Cooke was the author of Greene's Tu Quoque.

Edmond Malone and David Kathman speculated that Cooke was the "Saunder" who appeared in the plot of Part 2 of The Seven Deadly Sins. The existing plot is believed to be from a 1597-8 revival of the play, which was first performed in 1585. Kathman's argument that the plot is from a revival is based on the fact that Thomas Belte-a contemporary of Cooke-may also appear on the plot. In addition, records show that Cooke was at some point referred to as "Saunder"; he is listed under this name on his daughter's baptismal record.

In Gary Blackwood's 1998 novel The Shakespeare Stealer, Cooke is portrayed as the hero's best friend, Sander.
