= Richard Cowley =

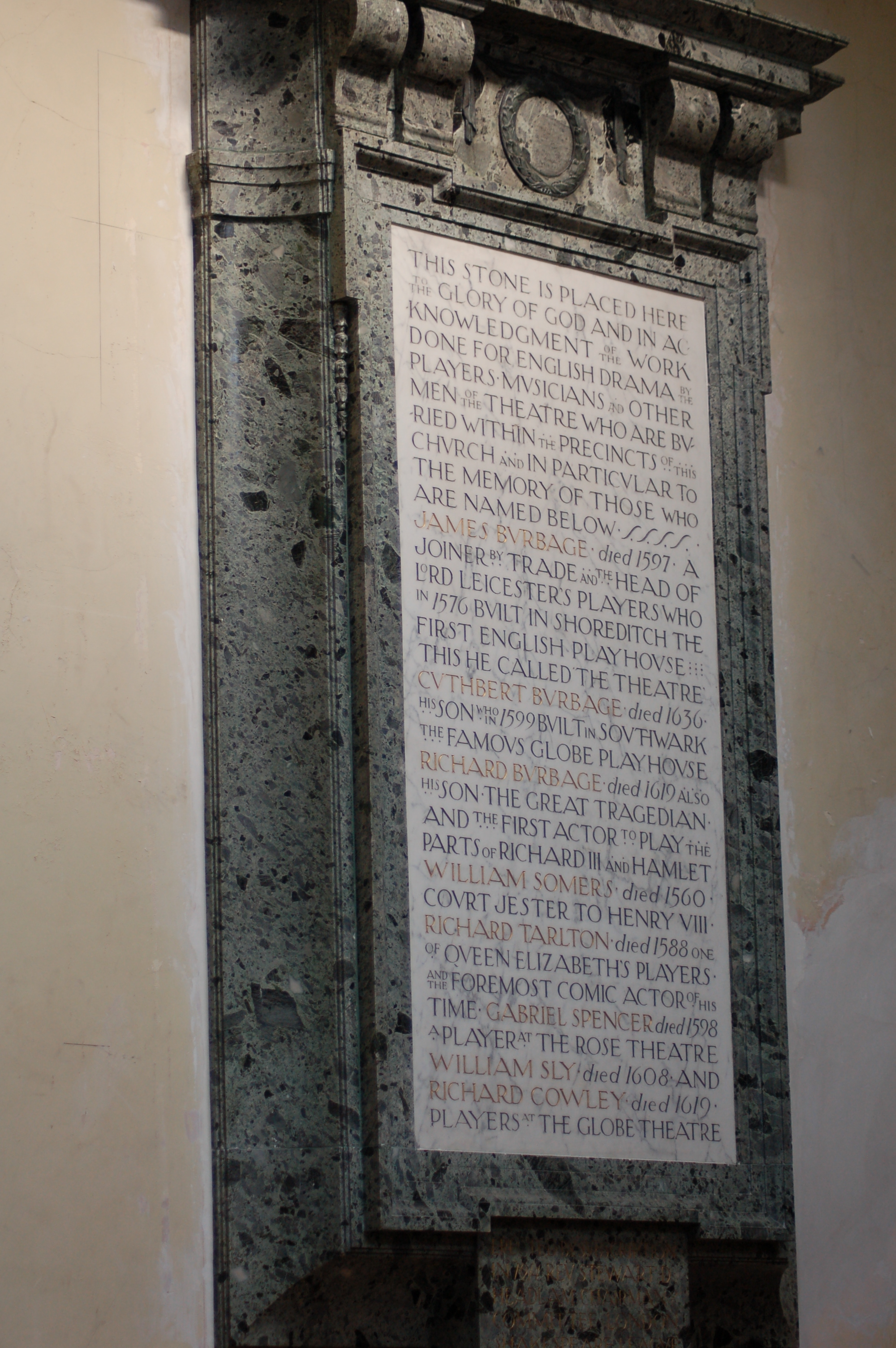
- Memorial plaque in St Leonard's, Shoreditch commemorating Cowley and other actors.
- Died: 1619; London
- Occupation: Actor
- Years active: 1591-1619

Richard Cowley (died 1619) was an English actor in English Renaissance theatre, a colleague of William Shakespeare and Richard Burbage in the Lord Chamberlain's Men and the King's Men.

== Career ==
Cowley was in the c. 1591 production of The Seven Deadly Sins, performed by personnel from the Admiral's Men and Lord Strange's Men — a production that included Richard Burbage and other future King's Men. Cowley acted seven minor roles in that production. He also toured with some of the same personnel under Edward Alleyn in 1593. He is thought to have been an original shareholder in the Lord Chamberlain's Men when they re-formed in 1594; but little is known about his career, except for the fact that he played Verges in Much Ado About Nothing, along with William Kempe as Dogberry. For some reason he is not in the cast lists on the three Ben Jonson plays acted by the company in 1598–1603; but he is still one of the sharers when the company is chartered as the King's Men in 1603, and he receives a bequest in the 1605 will of Augustine Phillips.

== Personal life ==
He is known to have married and had four children; two died young. His wife Elizabeth was buried on 28 September 1616 and his own burial followed on 12 March 1619. His will was witnessed by Cuthbert Burbage, John Heminges, Thomas Ravenscroft, and John Shank.
