= Sejanus His Fall =

1603 play by Ben Jonson

Title page of the 1616 folio edition, with list of actors opposite

Sejanus His Fall, a 1603 play by Ben Jonson, is a tragedy about Lucius Aelius Sejanus, the favourite of the Roman emperor Tiberius.

Sejanus His Fall was performed at court in 1603, and at the Globe Theatre in 1604. The latter performance was a failure. According to Jonson, an unnamed co-author "had good share" in the version of the play as it was "acted on the public stage". For reasons unknown the play was accused of promoting "popery and treason". Jonson was questioned, but no action was taken.

Jonson published the play in a revised version, replacing the contributions of his co-author with his own words. The published version was accompanied by copious marginal notes citing its historical sources, in quarto in 1605 and in folio in 1616.

== Stage history ==
Sejanus His Fall was first performed by the King's Men in 1603, probably at court in the winter of that year. In 1604 it was produced at the Globe Theatre. Contemporary witnesses, including Jonson, reported that the cast was greeted with heckles and hisses by their first audience at the Globe; the 1604 performance was "hissed off the stage". According to Park Honan, the later Roman works of Shakespeare, who had acted in Sejanus, carefully avoided "Sejanus's clotted style, lack of irony, and grinding moral emphasis."

The published cast list in Jonson's 1616 folio identifies the principal actors as Richard Burbage, Augustine Phillips, William Sly, John Lowin, William Shakespeare, John Heminges, Henry Condell, and Alexander Cooke (listed in that order). It is not known which parts were played by which actors. David Grote argues that the published list probably mixes two separate productions, as Lowin did not join the King's Men until after the first production. However Grote suggests that the most likely roles for these performers can be identified:

Sejanus, the largest role and a classic over-reacher in the Richard III manner, was obviously played by Burbage. The proud Silius, whose confrontation with Tiberius occupies the core of the first three acts and whose suicide is a traditionally noble Roman death, most likely would have gone to Heminges, with the more military Condell as the Guards Captain Macro. Phillips, who had been playing dissolute men for some time, would seem very likely for Tiberius if not for Jonson's hint that it was actually Shakespeare. Still, with Shakespeare as Tiberius, there is a very large role for an indignant speechmaker, Arruntius, that would have taken advantage of Phillips's rhetorical skills.

Grote further suggests that the unnamed other members of the company, Samuel Crosse, William Sly, and Robert Armin, played the roles of Lepidus, Terentius, and Sabinius.

From 1604 on, there is no record of a performance of Sejanus His Fall until 1928, when it was put on by William Poel. According to the play's modern editor Philip Ayres, Poel "cut the play by roughly a quarter" to "get away from the 'literary' 1605 published version to the 'hidden' stage play". More recently, the Royal Shakespeare Company staged the play in 2005. Later, as part of the many staged readings and livestream productions that took place during the COVID-19 pandemic, New York City's Red Bull Theatre produced a "livestream presentation" via YouTube on 17 May 2021 directed and adapted by Nathan Winkelstein, featuring notable Broadway and US television actors including Tamara Tunie (Sabinus), Laila Robins (Tiberius Caesar), Denis O'Hare (Sejanus), Keith David (Silius), Manoel Felciano (Natta), Matthew Rauch (Drusus), Stephen Spinella (Eudemus), and Emily Swallow (Livia), among others.

== Printing history ==
The play was entered in the Stationers' Register by Edward Blount on 2 November 1604. On 6 August 1605 Blount transferred his copyright to Thomas Thorpe, who published it in quarto that year (STC 14782), printed by George Eld. The printed text is accompanied by "copious marginal notes" citing the play's historical sources, which Jonson informs his readers were "all in the learned tongues, save one, with whose English side I have little to do". The play is prefaced by an epistle "To the Readers" by Jonson, and commendatory verses by George Chapman, Hugh Holland, 'Th. R.', generally assumed to be Sir Thomas Roe, John Marston, William Strachey, one 'Everard B.', and two poets who signed their verses as 'Cygnus' and 'Philos'. In 2023, the scholar Chris Laoutaris identified 'Cygnus' as William Shakespeare.

A 1616 edition in folio features Jonson's Epistle to Lord Aubigny, in which the dramatist again indicates that Sejanus was a flop when staged at the Globe Theatre.

== Allegations of treason ==
In the winter of 1618–19 Jonson told his friend William Drummond that the Earl of Northampton was his "mortal enemy" because Jonson had beaten one of the Earl's servants, and that Northampton had had Jonson called before the Privy Council on an accusation of "Popery and treason", based on Sejanus. What led to these accusations is unknown. It might have been something in the text or the performance of the play. Nor is it known exactly when this accusation was made, though it is likely to have been in the early period of James I's reign. However, according to Jonson expert James Loxley, "no action was taken, as far as we know".

There have been several theories about what may have led to the accusation. One theory is that the fall of Sejanus was thought to mirror that of the Earl of Essex, who had been executed in 1601. Another writer, Samuel Daniel was brought before the Privy Council in 1604 because his play Philotas was thought "to be a reflection of the dangerous matter of the dead Earl of Essex". However Philip Ayres has argued that Sejanus was thought to parallel the 1603 trial of Walter Raleigh, who had been found guilty of conspiring with Spanish Catholics to murder James I in the Main Plot. This might explain how a play set in ancient Rome was suspected of promoting "Popery". It has also been suggested that the central theme of the play, the dangers of rule by royal favourites, was the problem. In the early years of his reign, 1603–1605, James was especially sensitive to criticism of his supporters, given the several conspiracies against him, culminating in the 1605 Gunpowder Plot.

== Co-author ==
Jonson's epistle "To the Readers" in the 1605 quarto states that an unnamed author had "good share" in the version of the play which was performed on the public stage:

Lastly I would inform you that this book, in all numbers, is not the same with that which was acted on the public stage, wherein a second pen had good share; in place of which, I have rather chosen to put weaker (and no doubt less pleasing) of mine own, than to defraud so happy a genius of his right by my loathed usurpation.

Jonson's reference to "happy genius" have led some to speculate that William Shakespeare—who acted in the play—was Jonson's co-author on the original version of Sejanus, which has not survived. Another candidate for co-authorship is George Chapman, who later wrote a poem praising the play. Jonson was certainly collaborating with Chapman in this period, as his next play, Eastward Ho, was co-written with Chapman and John Marston.

== Influence on Shakespeare ==
John-Mark Philo has suggested that Shakespeare's experience with acting in Sejanus and its unfavourable reception may have influenced him in writing his Othello, also written in 1603 and performed by the same theatre company, the King's Men. The two plays have "similar plot devices, characterisation, opportunities for audience interaction and ... shared phrasing that doesn't appear anywhere else in Shakespeare's work".
