= Lord Strange's Men =

16th/17th-century English playing company

Lord Strange's Men was an Elizabethan playing company, comprising retainers of the household of Ferdinando Stanley, Lord Strange (pronounced "strang"). They are best known in their final phase of activity in the late 1580s and early 1590s. After 25 September 1593, they were known as the Earl of Derby's Men, that being the date of Stanley's accession to his father's title.

== History ==
Early iterations of the company were active in the 1560s and 1570s; Henry Stanley, 4th Earl of Derby, kept players both before and after his accession to the title in 1572. A later iteration was active throughout the 1580s, playing at Court in 1580–1, 1583, and 1585–6. And "active" was the key word: they were a troupe of acrobats, led by John Symons "the Tumbler." In 1588 the company went through a re-organization: Symons and the other tumblers left for a competing troupe, Queen Elizabeth's Men. Lord Strange's became a company more devoted to acting; William Kempe, Thomas Pope, and George Bryan, all future Lord Chamberlain's Men, may have joined the company at this time.

In November 1589, the Lord Mayor of London ordered the company not to stage any performances within the city. In response, Strange's Men immediately went to the Cross Keys Inn to mount a performance.

Lord Strange's Men were associated with the Lord Admiral's Men from 1590 to 1594; in the winter of 1591 Strange's Men gave six performances at Court. They were also performing at The Theatre, and perhaps at the Curtain as well. The "plot" of one of their plays, The Seven Deadly Sins, survives from this era, with a cast list that includes Richard Burbage, William Sly, Richard Cowley, and Augustine Phillips, more Lord Chamberlain's Men of the future.

Between February and June 1592 they were at Henslowe's Rose Theatre, where they acted a repertory of 23 plays that included one or more of Shakespeare's Henry VI trilogy. It has been argued that during that season William Shakespeare was a member of the company and had a hand in one of their plays, A Knack to Know a Knave. They gave three more Court performances in the winter of 1592–3; but on 28 January 1593 bubonic plague broke out again in London, an outbreak so severe that it would disrupt the entire framework of professional theatre in the capital. A combination of Strange's and Admiral's actors, led by Edward Alleyn, toured the countryside in 1593–4, visiting Kent, Southampton, Bath, Bristol, Shrewsbury, and perhaps to York and Chester before turning south again to Leicester and Coventry.

When Ferdinando Stanley died in April 1594, the company was still touring, in East Anglia and Hampshire. They returned to London in June, after the plague had abated. The company endured a radical re-organization at this time; many members left to join a new version of another troupe, under the patronage of Lord Hunsdon, the Lord Chamberlain — which became famous as the company of William Shakespeare and Richard Burbage, the Lord Chamberlain's Men.

== Derby's Men ==
A company of actors continued to function as Derby's Men, under the patronage of the sixth Earl; this organization probably included men who did not make the move to the Chamberlain's company. Derby's Men concentrated on touring the provincial towns outside London for the remainder of their career, down to 1618 – though they enjoyed one flurry of London activity under the leadership of Robert Browne around the turn of the century, including four performances at Court in 1600 and 1601.
