= John Heminges =

English actor and theatre manager (1566–1630)

John Heminges (Note: Also spelled Heming, Hemynges and — in both the First Folio, which he edited, and also on the monument in the graveyard where he is buried — it is spelled Heminge.) (bapt. 25 November 1566 – 10 October 1630) was an English actor in the King's Men, the playing company for which William Shakespeare wrote. Along with Henry Condell, he was an editor of the First Folio, the collected plays of Shakespeare, published in 1623. He was also the financial manager for the King's Men.

== Life ==
Heminges was baptised at St Peter de Witton Church, Droitwich, Worcestershire, on 25 November 1566. Sent to London at the age of twelve, he was apprenticed for nine years to the City Grocer John Collins, becoming a freeman of the Grocers' Company on 24 April 1587. On 10 March 1588 he received a licence to marry Rebecca Knell (née Edwards), the widow of William Knell, an actor with the Queen's Men who had been killed at Thame, Oxfordshire, in 1587 by John Towne, a fellow actor. Heminges and his sixteen-year-old wife settled in the parish of St Mary Aldermanbury, and had at least thirteen children there between the years 1590 and 1613.

Heminges's association with the theatre had begun by 1593, when he and Augustine Phillips were with Lord Strange's Men. By the next year he and Phillips had joined the Lord Chamberlain's Men, later the King's Men. Heminges remained with the Company until his death. Privy Council records from 1630 state that he received £100 to relieve the Company during a period of plague.

In August 1604, Augustine Phillips and Heminges and their King's Men fellows served at Somerset House as grooms in the household of the Spanish ambassador Juan Fernández de Velasco y Tovar, 5th Duke of Frías. The actors, possibly including William Shakespeare, may have employed simply as extra hired help in magnificent households appointed for the ambassadors, and were not necessarily the recipients of special royal favour.

Heminges remained active in the Grocers' Company alongside his theatrical activities; indeed, the two sometimes intertwined. On 13 December 1608 he was admitted as one of the ten seacoal-meters for the city of London, citizens appointed to measure the coal imported into the city by sea. Shortly afterwards he took on John Jackson as his deputy. Both Heminges and Jackson later acted as trustees for William Shakespeare when he purchased the Blackfriars Gatehouse in 1613. Between 1595 and 1628 Heminges took on ten apprentices with the Grocers' Company. Of these ten, eight appear to have performed for Heminges's company, in both boys' and adult roles. Alexander Cooke was one of his apprentices. Heminges also built and operated a taphouse at the Globe.

Heminges was mentioned in Shakespeare's will, along with Richard Burbage and Henry Condell, each being bequeathed 26 shillings and eightpence to buy mourning rings. Burbage died before the publication of Shakespeare's First Folio, but Heminges and Condell became credited contributors of the book. They mentioned in their preface, "To the great Variety of Readers", that they wished "the Author himselfe had liv'd to have set forth, and overseen his owne writings", they also mention their own care and pain "to haue collected & publish’d" the works. Their editorial efforts were vital to preserving a number of Shakespeare's plays, some of which might have been lost otherwise.

As a sharer in the Globe Theatre, Heminges’s name, along with the other sharers, is mentioned several times in various legal documents that were discovered by American researcher Charles William Wallace. The Globe was plagued by lawsuits as the shares were left to beneficiaries who did not have the continued welfare of the company at heart. In one such lawsuit, Heminges v Ostler, Heminges was sued by his daughter, Thomasina Ostler over a share of the company. The surviving records do not specify the final outcome of the suit. At his death, Heminges’s shares in the Globe and Blackfriars theatres passed to his son, William Heminges. The lawsuit records are valuable to historians for the detailed information they contain regarding the company business.

Heminges died in October 1630 in Southwark, and was buried 12 October 1630 at the parish church of St Mary Aldermanbury. In his will he had asked to be buried as close to his wife as possible.

== Work ==
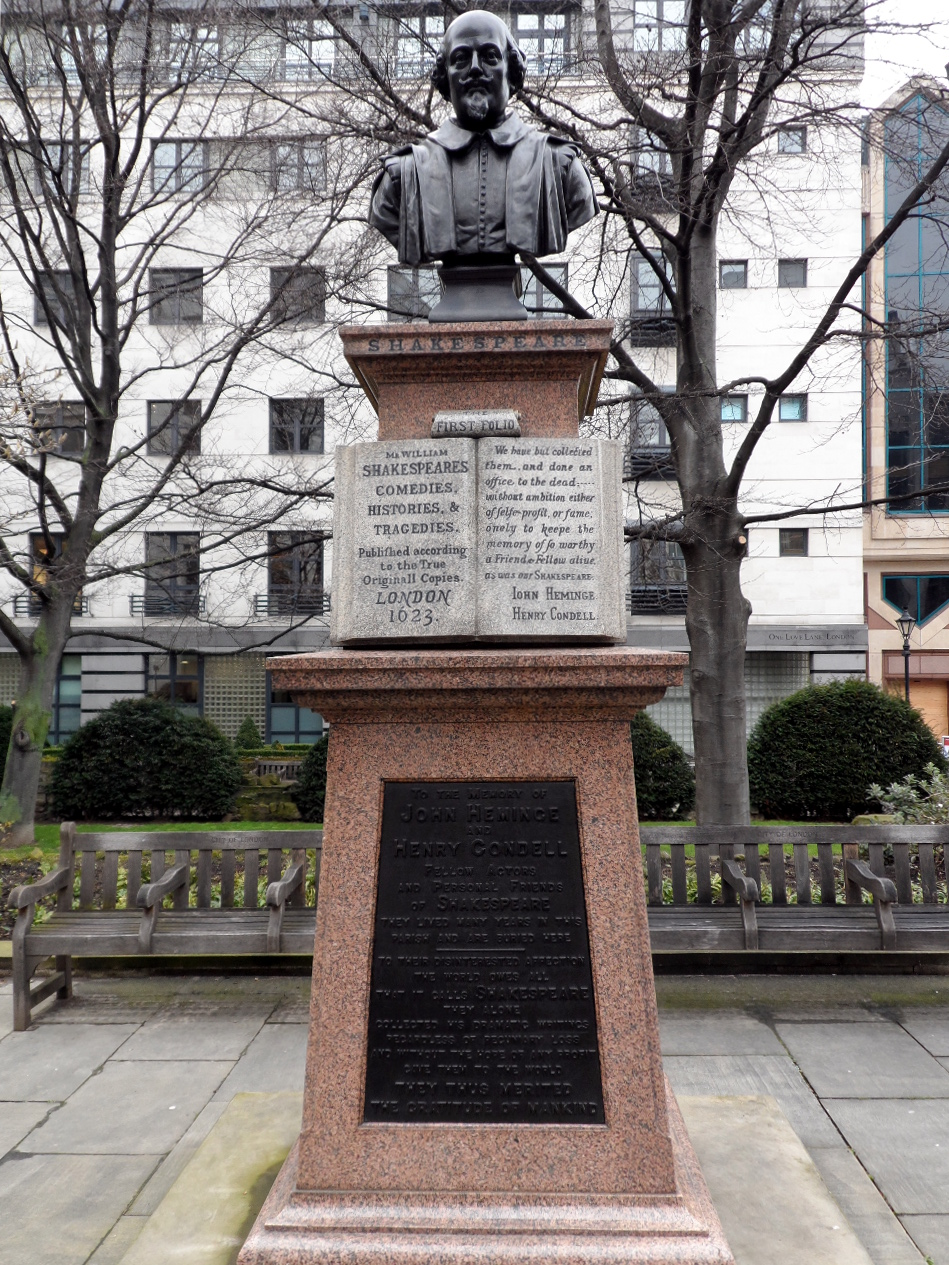
John Heminges and Henry Condell Memorial in London, commemorating their work with Shakespeare

The extent and nature of Heminges's acting is not entirely clear. He is known to have performed in Ben Jonson's Sejanus and Every Man in His Humour (in both cases, alongside Shakespeare). A Jacobean inscription in the 1616 Jonson folio lists him playing the role of Corbaccio in Volpone; since the same list includes Nathan Field, who did not join the King's Men until 1616, it seems that Heminges continued to act, at least intermittently, into his fifties. Edmond Malone reported seeing Heminges's name associated with the role of Falstaff; there is, however, no other evidence of this connection. There is little more evidence to substantiate the claim later made by an actor to Alexander Pope that Heminges was a tragedian. Of his activities as manager more is known. Court documents relating to the King's Men generally list Heminges as the recipient of money due the company; the records of Henry Herbert indicate that Heminges at least sometimes served as the point of contact between the company and the Master of the Revels. He appears to have owned a structure abutting the Globe Theatre, which may have been used as an alehouse. He served as trustee for Shakespeare when the latter purchased a house in Blackfriars in 1613.
