= Richard Burbage =

English actor and theatre owner (1567–1619)

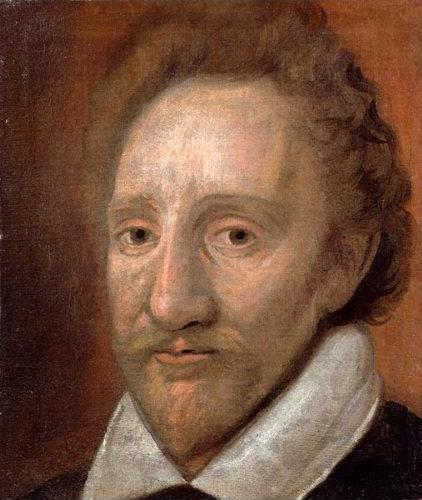
Portrait of Richard Burbage, Dulwich Picture Gallery, London

Richard Burbage (6 January 1567 – 13 March 1619) was an English stage actor, widely considered to have been one of the most famous individuals of the Globe Theatre, and of his time. In addition to stage acting, he was also a theatre entrepreneur. He was the younger brother of Cuthbert Burbage. They were both actors in drama. Burbage was a business associate and friend to William Shakespeare.

He was the son of James Burbage, a joiner who became a theatrical impresario and entrepreneur, founding a theatre. Burbage was a popular actor by his early 20s. He excelled in tragedies. His early acting career is poorly documented. Like many young actors of his time, he may have played the part of women in productions before taking any of the roles for which he is known. As James Burbage acted for the Earl of Leicester's company, it has been suggested that his son, Richard, likely got his start with the company as well.

Burbage was described as being short and stout but was said to be an impressive figure, with numerous praises written of him in contemporary accounts. His power and scope as an actor is revealed in the sheer size of the roles he played. He was a great box office draw. Of the hundreds of plays and thousands of roles for actors that date from the 1580–1610 era, there are only twenty or so roles that are longer than 800 lines. Edward Alleyn was the first English actor to manage such roles, in Marlowe's Tamburlaine and The Jew of Malta; but the majority of these star roles, thirteen of the twenty, were acted by Burbage. He was said to be quite rich because he was earning income from being the primary housekeeper of two playhouses, a sharer in the King's Men, a lead actor and a painter.

== Life ==
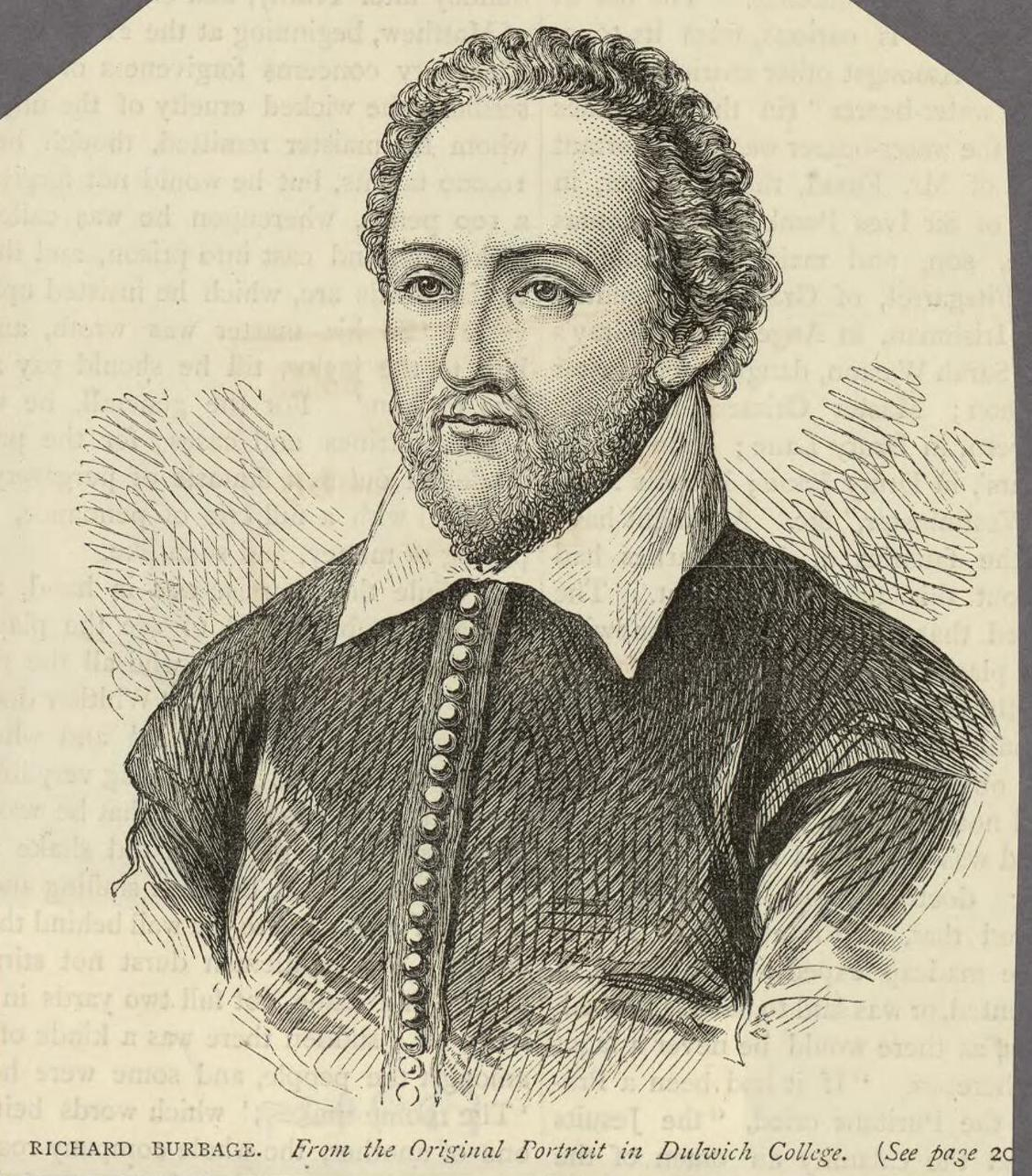
19th century print of Richard Burbage

Burbage was baptised at St Stephen's Church in London on 7 July 1568. He was the second son of his parents, followed by three younger sisters: Alice, Joane, and Ellen. His father brought Burbage to the theatre and had the greatest influence on his career. Being the son of a builder and owner of the first successful permanent playhouse gave him a start in the theatre world. It is said that because he worked in the theatre with his father at such a young age, he learned the basics of working with colours and the techniques of painting, which helped him later in life.

After the death of their father in February 1597, Richard and his brother Cuthbert stepped in to rescue the family's interests in two London theatres and found themselves tied up in lawsuits. They kept the Blackfriars Theatre, but leased it to lawyer and impresario Henry Evans, who used it for a troupe of child actors. The other, called simply ‘The Theatre’, was dismantled when they could not resolve terms for a new lease with Giles Allen, the landowner. Richard's father was influential in many parts of the acting industry at the time, as he owned one of the largest theatres at the time and directly worked with Shakespeare on his plays.

The beams, posts, and other remnants of ‘The Theatre’ were moved to a new location on the south side of the Thames River and reassembled into a new playhouse called the Globe in 1599.

The Burbage brothers kept half the shares in the new theatre and gave the remainder to Shakespeare and other members of the Chamberlain's Men. Income from the Blackfriars lease helped fund the move to the Globe. In 1608 the brothers ended the Blackfriars lease and moved the company to the new theatre. Burbage was performing there on 29 June 1613, when it caught fire and burned down. During the winter months, when it was not practical to use the open-air Globe, they used the Blackfriars. It was much smaller and seated about 700 people.

The Burbage brothers maintained a close working and personal relationship throughout their lives; they were neighbours on Halliwell Street in Shoreditch, near the Theatre.

Burbage married Winifred Turner on 2 October 1600 at St Mary's Rotherhithe. Burbage fathered at least eight children; after his death, his widow Winifred married another of the King's Men, Richard Robinson. (Note: See also: Nicholas Tooley.)

== Career ==
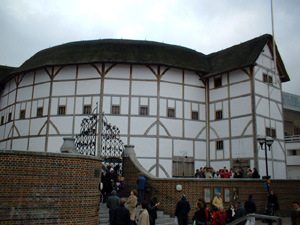
The modern reconstructed Globe Theatre. Burbage was performing on the stage of the original structure in the late 16th-early 17th centuries

Richard Burbage was probably acting with the Admiral's Men in 1590, then joining Lord Strange's Men in 1592, and with the Earl of Pembroke's Men in 1593, but most famously he was the star of William Shakespeare's theatre company, the Lord Chamberlain's Men, which became the King's Men on the ascension of James I in 1603. He played the title role in the first performances of many of Shakespeare's plays, including Hamlet (in which Burbage was one of the likely influences for the main character and plot), Othello, Richard III, Romeo and Juliet, Macbeth, and King Lear. But he was in great demand and also appeared in the plays of many of the great contemporary writers, such as Ben Jonson (the title role in Volpone, and Subtle in The Alchemist), John Marston (The Malcontent), John Webster (The Duchess of Malfi) and Beaumont and Fletcher (The Maid's Tragedy). Burbage grew up in the life of the theatre as his father owned one of London's playhouses, leading some to cite his upbringing around the arts as the reason for his acting skills.

Burbage played a central role in the pageant London's Love to Prince Henry on 31 May 1610. Unlike Alleyn or his fellow King's Man Shakespeare, Burbage never retired from the stage; he continued acting until his death, aged 52, in 1619. He was not such an astute businessman as either Alleyn or Shakespeare; at his death he was said to have left his widow "better than £300" in land—a respectable estate but far less than Alleyn's substantial wealth, and less than the net worth of Shakespeare at his death (also aged 52) in 1616.

== Influence on acting ==
Burbage was the first actor to play Hamlet and continued to act until he died. Aside from Hamlet, he was also known for his role as the Duke from Measure for Measure. Burbage's acting style allowed him to "easily slip into character". He was known to play characters believably – a difficult feat during his time: theatre being a newer form of formal entertainment in Elizabethan England, actors could not rely on suspension of disbelief to aid their performance.

== Death ==
Burbage remained a crowd favourite, even when younger actors emerged, for 35 years, and was an idol of his age. His last recorded performance was in 1610, but he acted with the King's Men until his death in 1619. His death caused such an outpouring of grief that it threatened to overshadow the official mourning for the death of Anne of Denmark.

He was buried in St Leonard's, Shoreditch, a church close to two theatres: "The Theatre" and "The Curtain Theatre". His gravestone was said to read "Exit Burbage." Although his gravestone is now lost, a memorial to him and his brothers was erected in a later century. An anonymous poet composed for him A Funerall Elegye on the Death of the famous Actor Richard Burbage who died on Saturday in Lent 13 March 1619, an excerpt of which reads:

He's gone and with him what a world are dead.
Which he review'd, to be revived so,
No more young Hamlet, old Hieronimo (Note: "Hieronimo" or "Hieronymo" is the main character from Thomas Kyd's The Spanish Tragedy.)
Kind Lear, the Grieved Moor, and more beside,
That lived in him have now forever died.

Of the many elegies that followed his death, perhaps the most poignant is the brief epitaph:

Exit Burbage.

== Portrayals ==
Burbage was played by Lionel Belmore in the film Master Will Shakespeare (1936), by Paul Freeman in the miniseries Will Shakespeare (1978), Martin Clunes in the film Shakespeare in Love (1998), by Jalaal Hartley in the Doctor Who episode "The Shakespeare Code" (2007), by Steve Speirs in the BBC sitcom Upstart Crow (2016), by Mattias Inwood in the TNT drama Will (2017) and by Adam Colborne in the third episode of the miniseries Good Omens (2019), co-produced by the BBC and Amazon Video.

London's National Portrait Gallery houses two portraits of Burbage.

== Speculation about Burbage ==
=== Portraiture ===
It has sometimes been argued that the famous Chandos portrait of Shakespeare was painted by Burbage. His skills were in demand. Some believe that the anonymous oil painting used so often nowadays to show what Burbage looked like was a self-portrait. Dulwich College holds a painting of a female head in a roughly similar style that was generally regarded as his work until it was found out in 1987 that it was probably misattributed to him and that it is a work by a North Italian painter. The "Felton" portrait of Shakespeare is also attributed to Burbage, and also a portrait of a woman which is currently preserved at Dulwich College, in Southeast London.

=== Hamlet theory ===
There is a theory that William Shakespeare's Hamlet was partly inspired by the death of Richard Burbage's father, not the death of Shakespeare's son Hamnet. A discrepancy between the dates of the death of Hamnet, the death of James Burbage, and the initial drafts of Hamlet lead some scholars to suggest this. Burbage's loss and his possible performance of an earlier version of the Hamlet character may have inspired some aspects of Shakespeare's more familiar version.

== Notes and references ==
=== Sources ===
- Barroll, Leeds (March 1996). Medieval and Renaissance Drama in England. Fairleigh Dickinson Univ Press. ISBN 9780838636411. Archived from the original on 24 April 2018.
- Gurr, Andrew (1992). The Shakespearan Stage 1574–1642 (3rd ed.). Cambridge: Cambridge University Press. ISBN 9780521410052.
- Halliday, F. E. (1964). A Shakespeare Companion 1564–1964. Penguin Reference Books. Vol. 27 (Revised ed.). Baltimore: Penguin. OCLC 222822680.
- Keenan, Siobhan (1 September 2019). New evidence about Shakespearean "star" actor, Richard Burbage. Notes & Queries (Report). Vol. 66. pp. 460–464.
- Marino, James J. (Winter 2014). "Burbage's Father's Ghost". English Literary Renaissance. 44 (1): 56–77. doi:10.1111/1475-6757.12021. ISSN 0013-8312. S2CID 145351981.
- McMillin, Scott (1987). The Elizabethan Theatre and The Book of Sir Thomas More. Ithaca, N.Y.: Cornell University Press. ISBN 9780801420085.
- Obermajerová, Kristýna (2009). Richard Burbage: The life, career and acting qualities of an Elizabethan player (PDF). Department of English and American Studies (B.A. thesis). Brno, Czech Republic: Masaryk University.
- Wells, Stanley (26 May 2011). "The First Great Shakespearian Actor". Blogging Shakespeare.
- Wickham, Glynne; Berry, Herbert; Ingram, William, eds. (2000). "Anonymous funeral elegy for Richard Burbage, 1619". English Professional Theatre, 1530–1660. Cambridge: Cambridge University Press. ISBN 0521230128.
