= Law of reentry =

Rule in English Renaissance theatre

The law of reentry, sometimes called the principle of the open stage, is a traditional rule in English Renaissance theatre where a character who exits the stage at the end of a scene cannot immediately reenter at the beginning of the next if it is set in a different location. Before the character may reenter, a conversation, speech, or other dramatic action must first take place to clarify that some amount of time has passed and prevent confusion.

The law of reentry has been used to explain the numerous scenes in Shakespeare's plays that begin or end with a monologue and the inclusion of speeches and scenes that were "otherwise unnecessary". Other scholars point to examples of a character immediately reentering with others or through another door as adequately illustrating that time has passed or the location has changed between scenes. The law is also described as a convention in public theatre houses, which did not have intermissions between acts, and not in private ones, which had intermissions.

== Principle ==
The law of reentry, or the principle of the open stage, was described by Robert Prölß in Von den ältesten Drucken der Dramen Shakespeares (1905) as: to avoid confusion in the audience, characters who leave the stage at the end of a scene cannot immediately reenter at the beginning of the next if the location has changed. Before the character may reenter, a speech, some dialogue, or "stage business" must first occur to suggest the passage of time. The character who exited may also immediately reenter with several others. Reynolds further suggested that reentering through a different door was sufficient to signal a change in location, and W. J. Lawrence also asserted that the law was not violated if the action was continuous. Lawrence further defined the law as asserting that the last speaker in a scene cannot be the first speaker in the next. The rule sought to prevent audiences from becoming confused and believing that a character was merely returning and that the scene was continuous without a change in location.

The intervening dramatic action or speech need not be lengthy, and business as simple as "alarm" or "a retreat sounded" or "alarums and excursions" may suffice. Smith observed that a Shakespearean character would typically reenter after about ten lines and further noted that this time off-stage may be shorter if the distance needed to travel between scenes was small, such as when moving between rooms within the same building.

=== Act changes and intermissions ===
Graves noted that there are many cases in which a character exits at the end of an act and immediately reenters at the beginning of the next act where the location has changed. He surmises that, in light of the law of reentry, this is evidence that there was an intermission (or an "act time") practiced between acts, even if such time went unremarked upon in stage directions. Rasmussen described the "innovation" of intermissions as allowing for characters to leave at the end of an act and immediately reenter without violating the law. Reynolds similarly noted that a character exiting at the end of an act and immediately reentering at the beginning of the next is not violating the rule.

Scholars describe the law as prevalent in Shakespeare's works before the King's Men acquired the Blackfriars Theatre in 1608 and moved from the conventions of public theatre to those of private theatre. The public theatre did not use intermissions between acts where a private theatre, like Blackfriars, did.

== In scholarship ==
The law of reentry was noted to be so strictly observed that violations are noteworthy. Lawrence felt that "so strictly was the Law of Re-entry obeyed that, where we find it contravened, we have reason to suspect that clumsy revision has taken place and an intervening scene been removed."

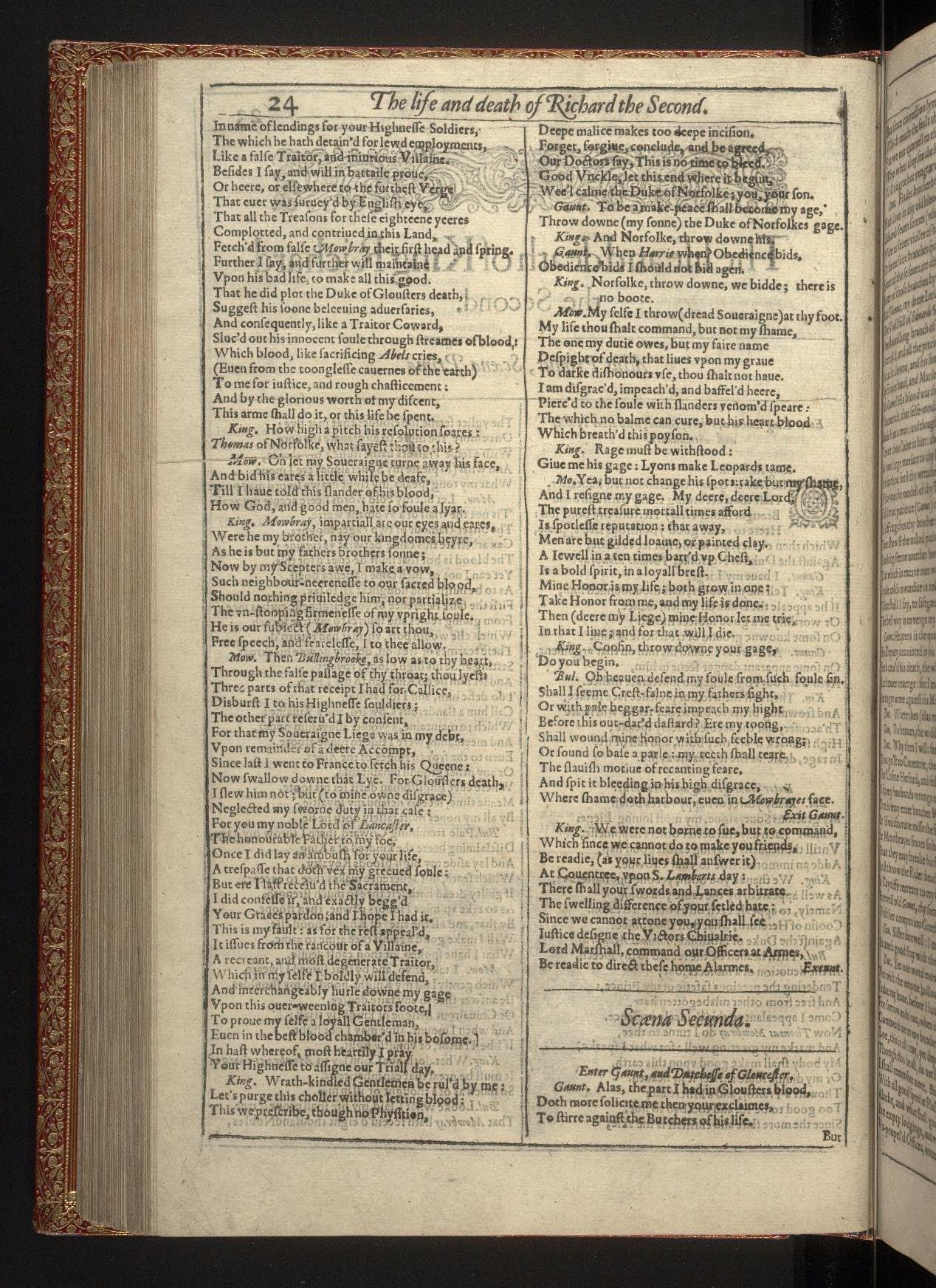
Page from the First Folio, showing Richard II. John of Gaunt exits (red circle) for no clear reason just before the end of Act 1 Scene 1, and re-enters the stage at the start of Scene 2 to speak with the Duchess of Gloucester.

Prölß suggested that short scenes were often inserted between characters exiting and entering to keep the law of reentry in Shakespeare plays. Neuendorff felt that the law was a significant influence on the dramatic construction of plays; Reynolds paraphrased Neuendorff as feeling the law explained why many scenes in Elizabethan plays begin or end with a monologue and include (in Reynolds' words) "speeches or even scenes otherwise unnecessary". Reynolds, however, was "not entirely convinced" that this was done as often as Prölß believed to keep the rule and indicate passage of time and felt it was more to indicate a scene change. While considering revisions John Fletcher made to A Wife for a Month, Robert Kean Turner speculated that a speech of "mostly filler" lines occurring at the end of Act III Scene 2 was an attempt at resolving a violation of the law of reentry. Eric Rasmussen similarly pointed to the law as the motivation behind a revision in The Second Maiden's Tragedy that added an eleven line soliloquy breaking up the exit of the Tyrant and his soldiers and their reentry by a different door, though Martin White believed it was less to do with the law and more a practical consideration to buy time to execute a complicated scene change.

The law of reentry was also cited to explain why a character suddenly exits a number of lines before the end of a scene before reentering in the next one. John of Gaunt's in the first scene of the Folio version of Richard II is a commonly noted example: unnoticed by other characters, he makes a silent and unexplained exit—variously described as unmotivated, abrupt, and awkward—to apparently avoid violating the law. In the quarto version of the play, John of Gaunt leaves at the end of the scene and immediately reenters.

Wentersdorf speculated that a violation in The Taming of the Shrew suggests that an episode involving Christopher Sly was dislocated when the First Folio manuscript was printed, such as one that existed in the quarto version. J. Dover Wilson similarly believed that an apparent violation in The Tempest between Act IV Scene 1 into Act V Scene 1 made it "practically certain" that a scene between the two was deleted, though E. K. Chambers questioned this and Eric Rasmussen later noted that this instance is not necessarily a violation as an intermission would have intervened.

George Walton Williams cited the law as disproving the theory that Macbeth is the Third Murderer, as these characters being the same would violate the law twice across Act III Scenes 2, 3, and 4; he noted that the First Murderer exits with the Third at the end of scene 3 and does not reenter in scene 4 until after eight lines.

== Apparent violations ==
Violations of the law are called immediate reentrances. Immediate reentrances noted by scholars include:

- Romeo and Juliet (1597) by Shakespeare: Act II Scene 1 into Scene 2. Reynolds suggested this is not a violation of the law and believed that the characters were to reenter through a different door.
- The Taming of the Shrew (c. 1590) by Shakespeare: Wentersdorf suggested that the violation is caused by a scene involving Christopher Sly being dislocated when the First Folio manuscript was printed, such as one that existed in the quarto version.
- Hamlet (c. 1600) by Shakespeare: Act I Scene 4 into Scene 5. Reynolds suggested this is not a violation of the law and believed that the characters were to reenter through a different door.
- The Tempest by Shakespeare: Act IV Scene 1 to Act V Scene 1. Haines listed this as a violation, but Rasmussen felt that this is not as an intermission would have intervened.
- The Brazen Age (1613) by Thomas Heywood: Exiting by one door and immediately reentering another to represent the characters crossing a river. Reynolds suggested this is not a violation of the law.
- The Changeling (1622) by Thomas Middleton and William Rowley: Act III Scene 1 into Scene 2. Stage directions at the end of the scene state: Exit at one door and enter at the other. Nicol noted this as an awkward scene direction. Reynolds suggested this is not a violation of the law.
- The English Traveller (1627) by Heywood: Act IV Scene 2 into Scene 3. Stage direction states that Geraldine "goes in at one door and comes out at another", representing that he has moved into a different room within the house. Reynolds and Lawrence suggested this use of different doors is an "evasion of" and not a violation of the law.
- The Iron Age (1632) by Heywood: The Greeks leave the stage by one door and immediately reenter through another to represent their entry into Troy. Reynolds suggested this is not a violation of the law.

Haines dismissed a supposed instance in A Midsummer Night's Dream between Act III Scene 2 and Act IV Scene 1 because the characters do not exit the stage, rather they remain on stage asleep and awaken in the next scene. He further enumerated thirty-six immediate reentrances in Shakespeare. Haines and Smith both dismissed twenty-four of these apparent violations because they involved battle scenes where the reentry is stated or presumed to be preceded by alarums and excursions, which is sufficient.
