= The English Traveller =

Tragicomedy in five acts by Thomas Heywood

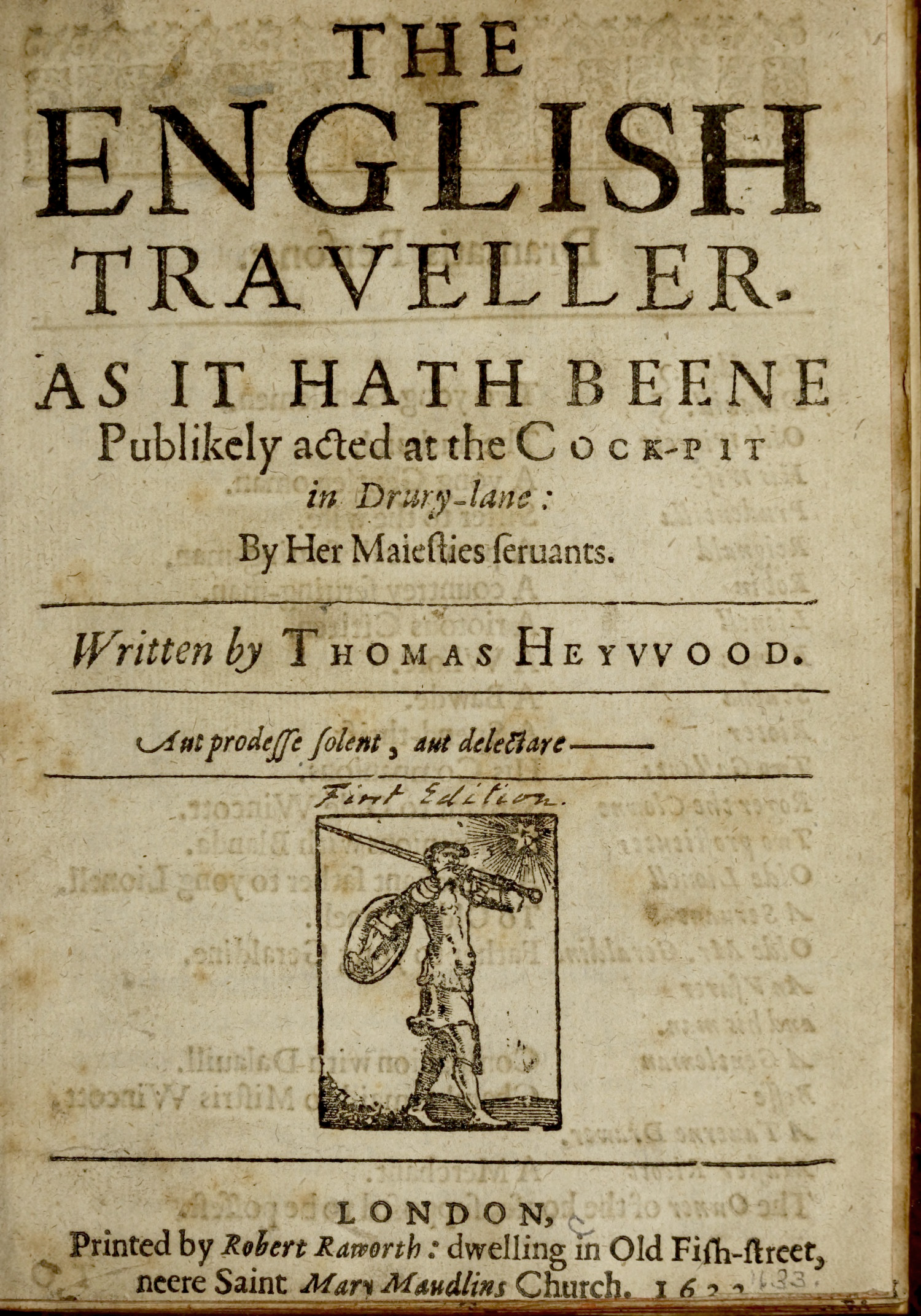
Title page of the first edition of The English Traveller, 1633

The English Traveller is a seventeenth-century tragicomedy in five acts written by Thomas Heywood, and named as such by the playwright. The play was first performed around the year 1627, and the first printed edition came out in 1633.

Consisting of two mostly self-contained, but thematically connected plots, one tragic and one comic, it trafficks in the elements of both city comedy and domestic tragedy. In the tragic plot, the recently returned traveler Young Geraldine contemplates forbidden love with the wife of his father's friend Wincott. In the comic plot, the rascal servant Reignald attempts an elaborate cover-up for Young Lionell's drunken party once his father returns from his mercantile voyages. Critics have recognized this as an important work of drama for its generic experimentation, for its investigation of the relationship between appearances and reality, and for its commentary on Renaissance households.

== Performance and publication ==
The play was first performed by Queen Henrietta's Men, an important company of players in Caroline England, and for which Heywood wrote other plays. According to the Stationers' Register, The English Traveller was entered to the printer Nicholas Okes on 15 July 1633, the entry reading "a Comedy called the Traveller by Mr Heywood". The quarto of 1633 is the only surviving early edition in any format. Its title page states that the tragicomedy appears "as it hath beene Publikely acted at the Cock-pit in Drury-lane", referring to the Cockpit Theatre, a prominent seventeenth-century theater. Along with a dedicatory epistle to Sir Henry Appleton, the playbook also features a brief statement "To the Reader," in which Heywood claims that he has had "an entire hand, or at least a maine finger" in two hundred and twenty plays.

== Synopsis ==
In the tragic plot, the newly returned (and titular "English Traveller") Young Geraldine is beloved by his friend Dalavill, his father Old Geraldine, his father's friend Wincott, and Wincott's Wife, who was Young Geraldine's childhood friend. Expressing mutual regret that they cannot be together on account of the youth's travels and now the current marriage with Wincott, Young Geraldine and the Wife make a pledge that they will be together one day in the future, a plan made feasible on account of Wincott's vigorous generosity toward Young Geraldine. Early playgoers might have been able to associate this plot thread with the situation in A Woman Killed With Kindness, regarded generally as Heywood's masterpiece. Things go awry, however, when Dalavil alerts Old Geraldine to his son's intentions, causing the father to block his son's visits to the Wincott household. When he does manage to return to Wincott's, the youth overhears intimate conversation between Dalavil and Wincott's wife, plunging him into misogynistic regrets and desires to return to his travels. In the very brief fifth act, Young Geraldine confronts the Wife, who dies of despair, and Dalavil, who flees, although the youth himself resolves to remain in England.

Tenuously connected to the tragic plot is a comedy involving another father-son duo. The prodigal Young Lionell wastes the allowances of his merchant father, Old Lionell, while the former is away on a voyage. The expenditures involve prostitutes, feasting, and drinking, which ends in a confused night of drunkenness mistaken for a shipwreck. When Old Lionell returns suddenly, the crafty servant Reignald goes to great lengths to protect Young Lionell's interests, first pretending the house is haunted, then feigning that Young Lionell took out a loan to purchase the house of Old Lionell's neighbor, Ricott. After falling for many of his servant's tricks, Old Lionell corners Reignald, but ultimately forgives him and reconciles with his son and most of his son's friends.

== Criticism ==
It has received very sparse commentary, but The English Traveller has been called "Heywood’s own most theatrically self-conscious play." Not only was it engaged in contemporary dramatic debates, but it also drew on classical models, including the Roman comedy of Plautus. According to Norman Rabkin, Heywood succeeds in undermining the expectations of his audience by way of the theme of deception. Focusing on the title, The English Traveller's most recent editor suggests the play proposes that, although there is much to be learned from traveling abroad, it remains safer to stay at home. In spite of its investment in a homiletic framework of sin and repentance, it also features a thoroughgoing interest in early household economies and the appetites and labors accompanying them.
