= The Fair Maid of the Exchange =

Play sometimes attributed to Thomas Heywood

The Fair Maid of the Exchange is a Renaissance play sometimes attributed to Thomas Heywood. First printed in 1607, the play was subsequently reprinted in 1625 and in 1637. It tells the story of three wealthy brothers – Ferdinand, Anthony, and Frank – who find themselves enamoured of Phyllis, the fair maid, and vie for her affections. Phyllis, however, is determined to win the favour of the Cripple of Fanchurch despite his indifference towards her. The play is set in Elizabethan London.

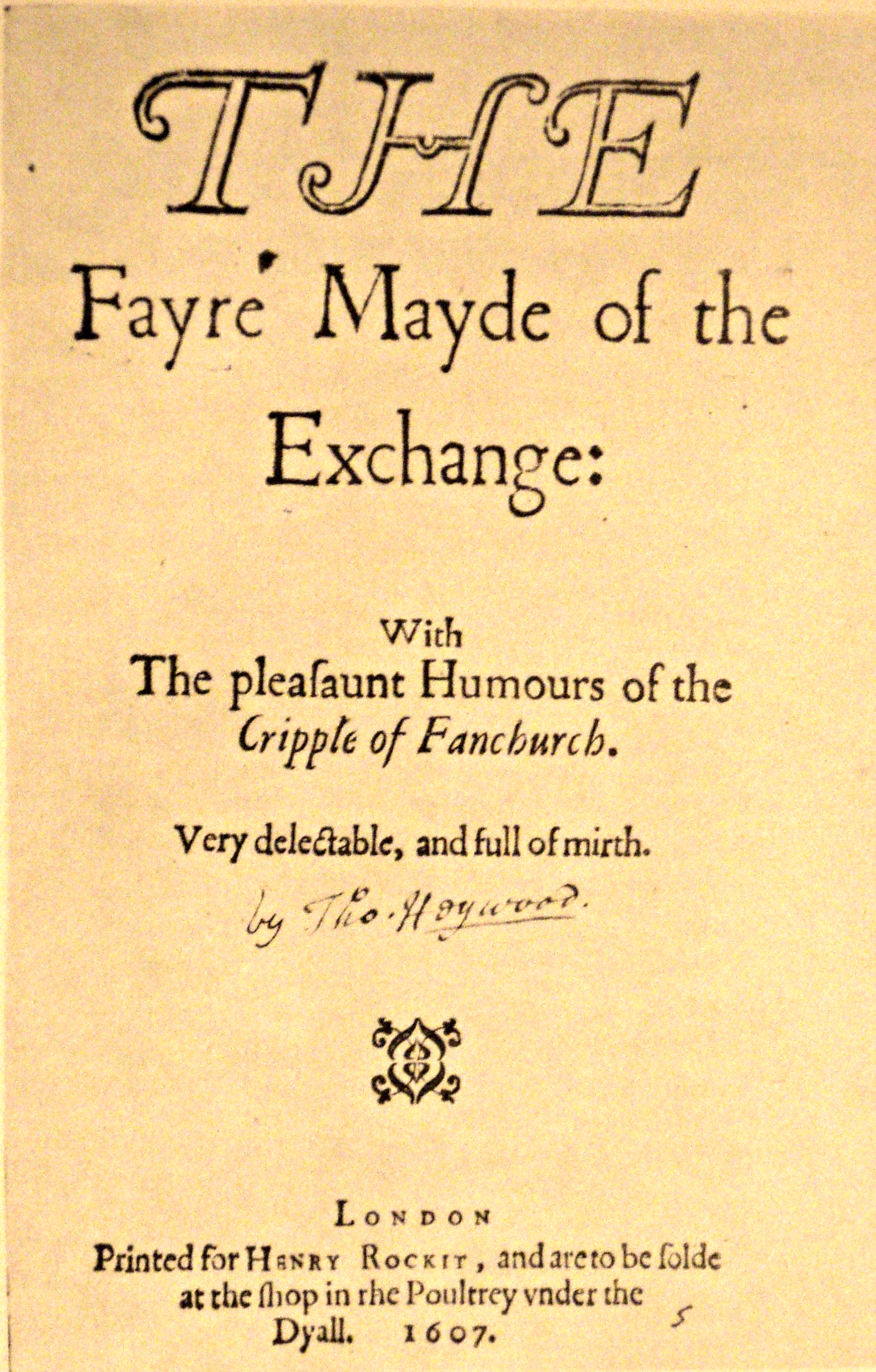
Cover page from the 1607 publication

The play is a city comedy, but can also be categorized as a comedy of intrigue as it entails comical sub-plots that involve the use "of disguises, mistaken identities, letters of misinformation, and false errands." This describes most of the play's action.

As the title page from the 1607 publication indicates, the play was first printed for Henry Rockit. It was also printed under two titles in the three editions printed between 1607 and 1637:

- The Fayre Mayde of the Exchange: with the pleasant humours of the Cripple of Fanchurch. Very delectable and full of mirth. (printed in 1607 by Valentine Simmes)
- The Fayre Maide of the Exchange: together with the merry humours, and pleasant passages of the cripple of Fanchurch. Furnished with varietie of delectable mirth. (printed in 1625 by John Legat, and in 1637 by 'A.G.' – the initials, perhaps, of Anne Griffin)

== Authorship ==
Authorship of this play has been – and continues to be – debated. Evidence currently available to prove or disprove authorship is weak at best. One fact in support of Heywood having written the play is that both Edward IV (1599) and If You Know Not Me, You Know Nobody (1605) were originally published anonymously. A counter argument for Heywood as the author lies in that he was known to add his own prefaces, dedications, and a motto to his plays. None of these appears in The Fair Maid of the Exchange. It is also conjecture that he wrote three scenes of the play and left the rest of the composition to a student of Shakespeare or Jonson. To validate this theory, however, and to distinguish the sections of the play written by him from those written by a co-author, one must have a firm sense of Heywood's style of writing and preferred subject matter.

While it is difficult to define what makes a play strictly Heywoodian, the playwright appears to have had a preoccupation with portraying the home and business lives of the English middle class of his time. The Fair Maid of the Exchange is indeed a play that treats these matters.

== Publication and performance ==
=== Publication ===
Speculative circumstantial evidence suggests that the play's composition took place between 1601 and 1602. Although the precise date of composition is unknown, four records of the play appear in the Stationers' Register:

- 24 April 1607
- 9 April 1616
- 27 February 1635
- 22 December 1647

=== Performance ===
Stage direction at various parts of the play (e.g. Fight and beat them away at line 101, and Give them the letters and they stampe and storme at line 2130) strongly suggests that the play was performed. Additionally, the division of 'dramatis personae' into 'Eleaven [who] may easily acte this comedie' is perhaps indicative of the 'division of labour' which would have been required for a travelling troupe. It is a possibility, then, that Thomas Heywood wrote the play for the purposes of performing it with his travelling company – Worcester's Men. Nevertheless, no extant record of performance exists for this drama.

Fair Maid of the Exchange will be performed at the American Shakespeare Center for the Actors' Renaissance Season in 2017.

== Dramatis Personae ==
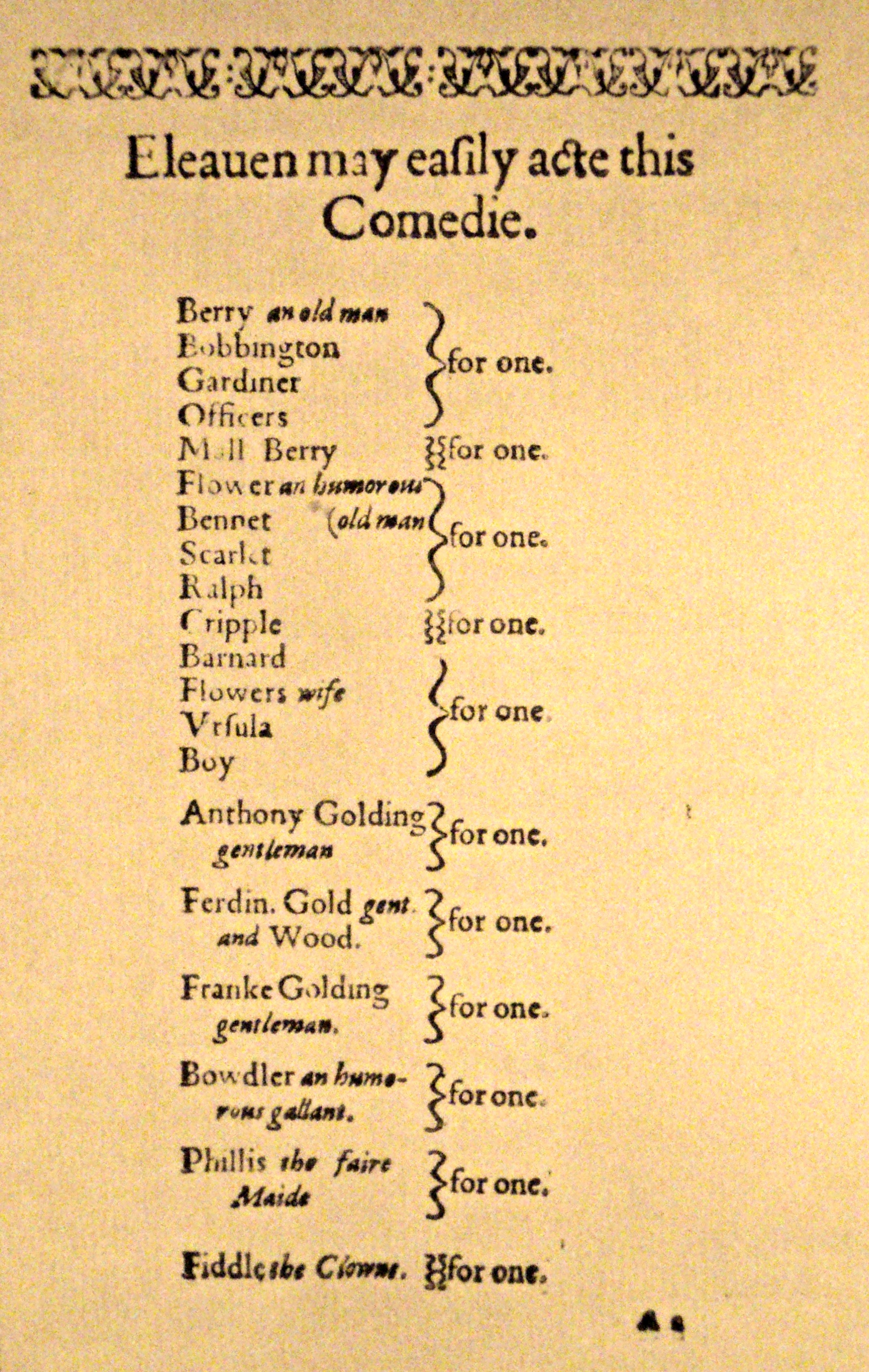
Dramatis Personae with designation of roles

- ANTHONY GOLDING, a wealth young man
- FERDINAND GOLDING, older brother to Anthony
- FRANK GOLDING, the youngest of the Golding brothers
- BERRY, an old man
- MALL BERRY, his daughter
- FLOWER, a humorous and wealthy old man
- MISTRESS FLOWER, his wife
- PHYLLIS, the fair maid and daughter of FLOWER AND MISTRESS FLOWER
- CRIPPLE, a cripple
- BOWDLER, a humorous gallant
- FIDDLE, a clown
- URSULA, friend to Phyllis
- BENNET, a gentleman
- BARNARD, a gentleman
- GARDINER, a gentleman
- BOBBINGTON (a.k.a. RACKET), an outlaw
- SCARLET, an outlaw
- RALPH
- BOY
- OFFICERS

== Synopsis ==
The play opens with two outlaws, Bobbington and Scarlet, attacking and robbing Phyllis and Ursula. The Cripple attempting to aid them, is himself accosted. Frank Golding, the youngest of the three Golding brothers, comes to their aid. As a token of gratitude Cripple promises to return the favour.

Meanwhile, Ferdinand and Anthony Golding are smitten with Phillis, having seen her in The Exchange. Frank Golding initially ridicules their sentiments, until one day when he kisses her hand to bid her farewell and instantly falls in love with her.

In a very minor but relevant sub-plot Phyllis's father, Master Flower, happens upon Bobbington (the racketeer), who claims to be a sailor bound for the Barbary (or Berber) Coast and to be in need of £10. He offers Flower a diamond ring worth £100 as collateral until his return, conceivably within three months. The willing Flower eagerly accepts the offer, secretly hoping the sailor is late in returning – for he may then keep the stone – but unwittingly entangles himself in a misdeed.

Ferdinand, the eldest of the brothers, requests that Frank pass a letter on to the maid. When Frank then overhears Anthony planning to have a porter carry his own letter to Phyllis, he disguises himself as the porter to which the letter is entrusted. Neither Ferdinand nor Anthony are aware of Frank's feelings for the maid. To [advance] his own [motives], Frank calls on Cripple – who owes him a favour – to help him win her over.

Frank surrenders his brothers' letters to Cripple, who produces two rejection letters ("borrowed" from the library of a deceased poet) for Frank to give to his brothers. When, in conversation, Anthony and Ferdinand discover from the fair maid herself that she has received no letters, they each write letters to her parents – Ferdinand to her father, Anthony to her mother – asking for her hand in marriage. Her parents secretly agree. As this is unfolding, Cripple expects Phyllis to come to him and finally reveal her true feelings to him. He sets a plan in place in which Frank is to disguise himself as the cripple and to impersonate him. True to form, Phyllis pledges her love for the cripple, who responds affirmatively, after which she gives him her ring as a symbol of their union. All that is left is for Frank (the "Cripple") to ask her parents for their blessing.

In the interim, Cripple has dispatched two additional letters to her parents. These are allegedly from Ferdinand and Anthony who have apparently had a change of heart and refuse the maid. Frank visits them to ask for their blessing, and in light of his brothers' "rejections" steps in and offers himself. Her parents agree.

Anthony and Ferdinand then arrive at Phyllis's home to claim her. The maid, seeing all three brothers there and urged by her father to choose from among them whom to marry, faints. At this her father panics and swears to let marry whomever she pleases. Following some deliberation and reflection, Phyllis chooses Frank.

The play concludes, rather inconclusively, with the arrest of her father when he is accused of stealing the diamond on his finger. It is the same diamond which he had accepted from Bobbington in exchange for a small loan. All leave the stage and presumably proceed to the magistrate.

== Themes ==
=== The nature of love ===
- Courtly love – this is a concept in which a man falls in love with a woman who is unattainable. Typically she is either married or otherwise promised to another. In most cases she rejects him harshly. In The Fair Maid of the Exchange there is a shift in which this concept is transposed from the court to the upper middle class of London's early seventeenth century.
- The will of a woman – Phillis is steadfast in her choice through most of the play (vacillating very briefly when forced to choose her mate at the end). Unlike the stock character Mall Berry – who is uncertain whom she loves and chooses Barnard only (and merely) after Cripple tells her so – the fair maid insists so intently on loving Cripple that when the thought of giving him up induces fainting her father is brought to his knees, vowing to allow her to select whomever pleases her best. Her ultimate choice (that is, Frank Golding) is predicated simply on Cripple's disinterest and unwillingness to requite her sentiments.

=== What's in a name? ===
There appears to be a preoccupation with names in the play. Part of the description of the fair maid is as follows: "...her name is Phillis, not Phillis that same dainty lasse that was beloved of Amintas, nor Phillis that doated on that comely Demophoon, but this is Phillis, that most strange Phillis, the flower of the Exchange." Phyllis is considered so esteemed that she may be counted amongst the greatest women in history and mythology. The name Phyllis may also be associated with classical literature as it applied in works by such authors as Horace.

Names in the play are similarly important to the marginalised class, as demonstrated by these lines spoken by a Boy (servant): "...were it not for modest bashfulnesse, / And that I dread a base contentious name, / I would not be a by-word to th'Exchange, / For every one to say (my selfe going by) / Yon goes a vassal to authoritie."

In addition to giving importance to the characters themselves, eponyms in the play also inform the audience of the characters' personalities or purposes, as shown in the "key terms" below.

== Key terms ==
APTRONYM:

- a name that fits some aspect of a character. The play is littered with characters whose names match their personalities: – e.g. Cripple, Fiddle, Scarlet, etc.
- CRIPPLE – a cripple
- FRANK – direct, truthful (ironic)
- FLOWER (Phillis) – the epitome of beauty in nature
- FIDDLE – a clown
- RACKET – career criminal (racketeering)
- SCARLET – famous for 'bloody deeds'

It is worth noting that there are 'personae' in the play who never appear but whose names likewise carry meaning:

- BROOKES – (n.) stream of water; (v.) to allow.
- PAWMER (PALMER) – a pilgrim.
- BARNES – from 'barn'

LEGERDEMAIN:

- sleight of hand, trickery.
- trickery through letters.
- trickery through disguise (as when Frank disguises himself as a 'Porter' and as 'Cripple'
- from 'leger du maine' (French – literally light of hand).
- uttered by Cripple when Frank, dressed as a porter, attempts to pass Anthony's letter (to Phillis) off as his own at line 1310.
- also associated with countless references to the hands, as when Frank falls in love with Phillis simply by kissing her hand: "I give my hand, and with my hand my heart".

== Bibliography ==
1. "Aptronym." Dictionary.com. Dictionary. 2012. Web. 21 October 2012.
2. Heywood, Thomas. The Fair Maid of the Exchange. Ed. Peter H. Davison. Oxford: The Malone Society, 1963. Print.
3. Heywood, Thomas. The Fayre Mayde of the Exchange: with pleasant humours of the Cripple of Fanchurch. London, 1607. Text Creation Partnership digital edition. Early English Books Online. Web. 4 October 2012.
4. "Legerdemain." Dictionary.com. Dictionary. 2012. Web. 10 October 2012.
5. Snyder, Karl E. A critical edition of The Faire Maide of the Exchange by Thomas Heywood. Ed. Stephen Orgel. New York:Garland Publishing, 1980. Print.
