= Jack o' Lent =

Historical English tradition

Jack o' Lent was a tradition in England in the 15th, 16th and 17th centuries involving the abuse and burning of a straw effigy during the season of Lent, ending with its burning on Palm Sunday.

The effigy, made of straw or stuffed clothes, was abused and stoned on Ash Wednesday while being dragged about the parish. In addition to being beaten, he could be incorporated into pageants and used as a figure to be mocked. The figure was kept until Palm Sunday, when it was burnt. Its burning was often believed to be a symbolic revenge on Judas Iscariot, who had betrayed Christ. It is equally likely that the figure represented the hated winter and its destruction prepares the way for spring.

Having the tradition of Jack o'Lent being creating an effigy for beatings and mockery, Jack o'Lent became a metaphor used in plays. Jack o' Lent is mentioned in Thomas Heywood's The Four Prentices of London, Shakespeare's Merry Wives of Windsor, Anthony Burgess' Nothing Like the Sun, Henry Fielding's Joseph Andrews as well as in the 1640s pamphlet, The Arraignment Conviction and Imprisonment of Christmas. In these shows, the Jack o'Lent metaphors were used as jokes.

== See also ==
- Burning of Judas
