= The Wise Woman of Hoxton =

City comedy by Thomas Heywood

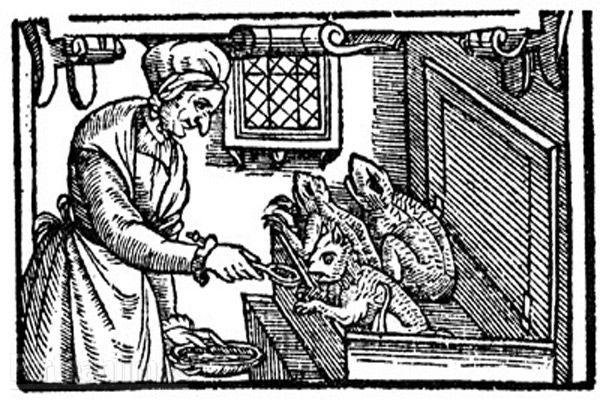
- Original language: English
- Written by: Thomas Heywood
- Genre: City comedy
- Setting: Hoxton, London

Premiere
- Date: c. 1604
- The Wise Woman of Hogsden at the Internet Archive

The Wise Woman of Hoxton is a city comedy by the early modern English playwright Thomas Heywood. It was published under the title The Wise-Woman of Hogsdon in 1638, though it was probably first performed c. 1604 by the Queen's Men company (of which Heywood was a shareholder), either at The Curtain or perhaps The Red Bull. The play is set in Hoxton, an area that at the time was outside the boundaries of the city of London and notorious for its entertainments and recreations. The Victorian critic F. G. Fleay suggested that Heywood, who was also an actor, originally played the part of Sencer. It has often been compared with Ben Jonson's comic masterpiece The Alchemist (1610)—the poet T. S. Eliot, for example, argued that with this play Heywood "succeeds with something not too far below Jonson to be comparable to that master's work".

== Characters ==
- Young Robin Chartley, a wild-headed gentleman
- Boyster, a blunt fellow
- Sencer, a conceited gentleman
- Haringfield, a civil gentleman
- Luce, a goldsmith's daughter
- Luce's father, a goldsmith
- Joseph, the goldsmith's apprentice
- Old Master Chartley, Robin Chartley's father, a country gentleman
- Serving-man 1, Young Chartley's man
- Giles, Old Chartley's man
- Sir Harry, a knight who is no piece of a scholar
- Gratiana, Sir Harry's daughter
- Tabor, Sir Harry's man
- Sir Boniface, an ignorant pedant, or schoolmaster
- The Wise Woman of Hoxton, who bears the name of the drama
- A Countryman, client to the Wise Woman
- A Kitchen Maid, who comes to the Wise Woman for counsel
- Two Citizen's Wives, who also come to the Wise Woman for counsel
- Luce 2, a young country gentlewoman
- Serving-man 2, Gratiana's man

== Text and composition ==
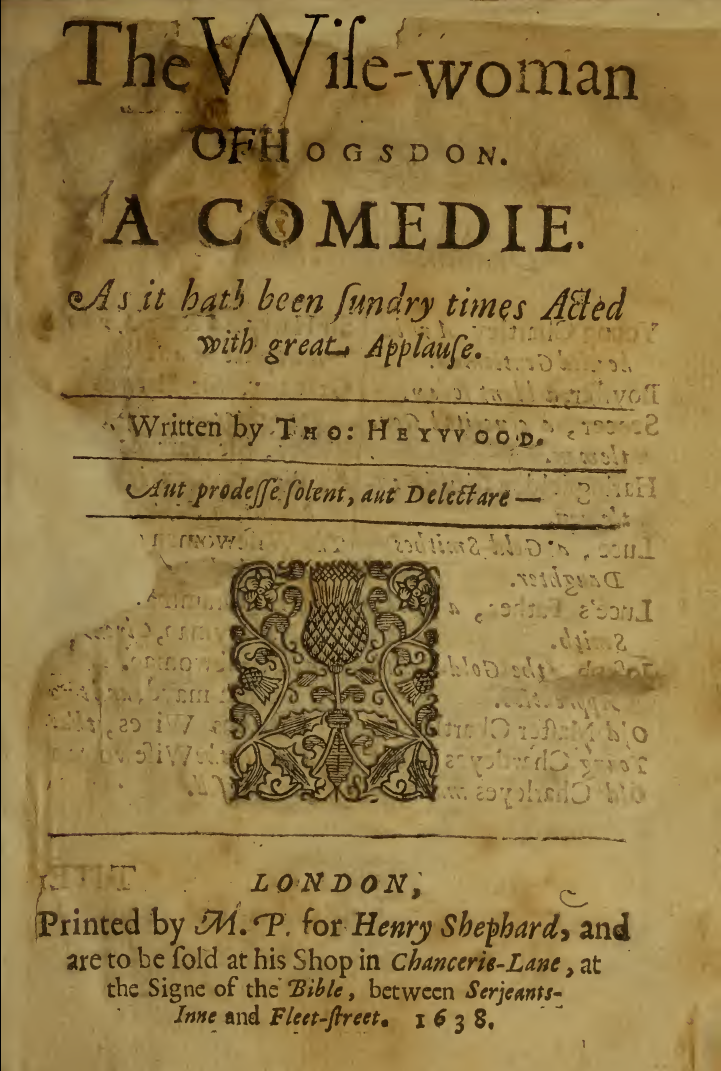
Frontispiece to the 1638 edition

=== Printing ===
The play consists of thirteen scenes divided into five acts, the longest of which is the final dénouement. This segmentation seems to be authorial, since Heywood appears to have been involved in the preparation of the play for publication in quarto in 1638, in which the act divisions appear. Henry Shepard, who had a shop "at the sign of the Bible" in Chancery Lane between Sergeant's Inn and Fleet Street (according to the play's title-page), published this first edition, on whose behalf "M. P." printed it (the printer is assumed to be Marmaduke Parsons).

=== Dramatic composition ===
The play employs both blank verse and prose, with a character's speech often switching between modes during a scene as its dramatic function changes. It also makes substantial use of audience contact and direct address. Many characters adopt disguises—particularly Luce 2, who is cross-dressed as a male (the page, "Jack"), who is subsequently cross-dressed again as a female for the pivotal masked wedding in the middle of the play. When Boyster meets Luce 2 on the street outside in the confusion of its immediate aftermath, he asks her (mistakenly thinking that this is the person he has just married) "What art thou, girl or boy?", to which she/he replies:

Both and neither: I was a lad last night, but in the
morning I was conjured into a lass, and being a
girl now, I shall be translated into a boy anon. Here's
all I can at this time say for myself. Farewell. (3.2.35–38)

As with the majority of female roles on the public stages of the early modern English theatre, Luce 2 would have been played by a boy player when the play was first performed.

=== Structure and presentation of space ===
With only three exceptions, the scenes alternate between interior and exterior dramatic locations. The interior of the Wise Woman's house in Hoxton is shown only twice—though, in each case, they are the most theatrical and significant scenes in the play (act three, scene one and act five, scene two). The central crisis in the play's dramatic structure is staged there (the secret wedding-ceremony, in which two pairs of disguised participants are married by the pedantical scholar and deacon, Sir Boniface, only to be abruptly dispersed when the Wise Woman interrupts with a false alarm). It is also the site of the complex dénouement in the final scene (whose sophisticated patterning of comic revelations from all sides has drawn the praise of many critics).

=== The Wise Woman ===
The play delineates the social identities of its characters clearly and locates them within a hierarchical system of relations with one another. The illiterate Wise Woman's "cunning" ignorance, which "can fool so many that think themselves wise" (as Luce 2 puts it in one of her frequent deflationary asides to the audience), is contrasted with the impenetrable learning of the "ignorant pedant" Sir Boniface, whose habit of conversing in Latin generates the significant comic action of the subplot.

The liminality of the Wise Woman's house, located in the disreputable suburbs outside the jurisdiction of the city of London, is also expressed in the marginality of the character herself and in her dramatic function. She is the enabling figure who steers the play towards its comic resolution, driven by the antagonistic action of the play's crossed-dressed heroine, Luce 2, which tempers and contains the disruptive forces released by the dissolute and intemperate protagonist, Young Chartley.

At the end of act four, scene three—having whispered her plan for the complex climax of the drama to Luce, Sencer, and Boyster, each in turn—the Wise Woman encourages them all to place responsibility for their fates in her ability to manage what she has called "a plot to make a play on." She promises that "if I fail in any of these or the rest, I lay myself open to all your displeasures." The Wise Woman functions as the comedy's stage-manager, master of ceremonies, or book-holder.

=== The two Luces ===
That the only two female characters to appear in act one share the same name—Luce—is not revealed to the audience until act three, just before the secret wedding, when Luce 2 explains as much in an aside. Despite this, the two are also clearly distinguished, both in social terms and in terms of the dramatic functions each serves.

Luce 2 has disguised herself as a page and offers herself as a servant to the Wise Woman, though in reality she is an aristocrat. The first appearance of her namesake, Luce 1, shows her at work, sewing. When her father arrives to endorse her precipitous proposed marriage to the aristocratic protagonist, Young Chartley, the older man is identified as "a plain citizen". Luce 1's father explains that he rejoices to hear that his daughter "is preferred / And raised to such a match" with a gentleman who, as Chartley claims, is worth ten thousand pounds.

Throughout the play, the citizen Luce [1] frequently stresses her lack of agency and self-determination. She is presented as a patient to the actions of others. She passively endures the pathos of the paradoxical state that the secrecy of the marriage creates, in which the meaningful social distinction between "maid" and "wife" is suspended for her. For the aristocratic Luce [2], in contrast, her disguise—and its ability to 'conjure' and 'translate' appearance—allows her far greater scope than her poorer namesake enjoys.

At the end of act one, when Luce 2 occupies the position of close contact with the audience, having eavesdropped on Young Chartley's plot to marry Luce 1, she reveals her disguise and the play's particular point-of-attack within a broader sequence of events: Young Chartley is in flight from a previous scene of matrimonial jilting, she explains, and she comes in pursuit of her wayward husband-to-be. Entering the drama, in this sense, in media res, she is fleeing a situation similar to that which her citizen namesake will soon experience—the suspension of the distinction "maid"/"wife". The trajectory of the aristocratic Luce 2's active pursuit of the praxis of dramatic agency counters and contains the flow of betrayals that emanates from the protagonist's desire and drives the action towards its comic resolution.

=== The protagonist's desire ===
Young Chartley, the play's aristocratic protagonist, frequently relates to the objects of his desire (Luce 1, then Gratiana) by means of imagery involving wealth, commodities, or sexual possession and objectification. When his marriage to the citizen Luce [1] has become an inconvenience to be discarded in act three, scene three, he regrets having made a match with "so beggarly a kindred" and having "grafted in the stock of such a choke-pear", when the far superior attractions of "a goodly popering" as the knight's daughter, Gratiana, are on display (an image which bawdily regards Gratiana as a popering pear, whose shape is associated with that of a penis and scrotum and a coital pun on "pop-her-in", in relation to the folk-song "Pop Goes the Weasel!").

In the first scene, when Chartley teases Sencer (his friend and competitor for the affections of Sir Harry's daughter and who is also identified as a gentleman) about his attempts to court Gratiana (before he sees her for himself in act three, scene three, when her brief appearance precipitates his decision to abandon Luce 1), Chartley claims that he has heard:

That she hath..., as other women have;
That she goes for a maid, as others do

The elision was to be filled extemporaneously in performance, presumably. As well as omitting a bawdy word from the printed text, the quarto of 1638 includes the stage direction "etc.", implying additional spontaneous elaboration by the player.

The idea of virginity as a deceptive disguise that women commonly adopt forms a refrain that is heard several times, which relates to the paradoxical position in which the secrecy of the marriage places Luce, as simultaneously "[a] maid and a wife" (4.3.26)—which Luce 2 recognises as her own position, too. When Luce 1 finally acquiesces to Chartley's demands near the end of the first act, the proposal of marriage is inextricably yoked to the question of her virginity—the question he actually asks is not "will you marry me?" but rather "I hope thou art a maid, Luce?"—and, given his dominance up until this point of the register of audience contact (his displacement from this position by Luce 2 brings the first act to a close; he doesn't occupy it again until the end of act three), a comic moment of ironic counterperspective, expressed when Luce responds in the affirmative through audience contact, seems implicit.

== Performance history ==
The play was given a staged reading at Shakespeare's Globe Theatre on 4 November 2001, as part of their Read, Not Dead programme. This is a script-in-hand staging that the actors rehearse for the first time on the same day as the performance. When The Wise Woman of Hoxton was presented, one cast-member recalled how, at the beginning of act four, scene three, Alex Harcourt-Smith, in the role Sencer (who has a soliloquy to the audience at this point in the play), missed his cue: "After what seemed an eternity (but was probably only a minute or so of dead stage time) the realisation dawned on the actor that it was his “turn” and he exploded on to the stage with a line gifted beautifully to him in the text, “Now or Never!” You can imagine that this brought the house down!" The performance was staged by Alan Cox, with Jeanne Hepple as the Wise Woman, Rebecca Palmer as Luce 2, Alexis Karne as Luce 1, and Katarina Olsson as Gratiana; James Wallace played Chartley, James Chalmers played Boyster, and Jean-Paul van Cauwelaert was Haringfield, with Bryan Robson as Sir Harry and Liam McKenna as Sir Boniface.

== Analysis and criticism ==
Writing in 1888, John Addington Symonds argued that despite the play's superficial resemblance to Ben Jonson's comic masterpiece The Alchemist (1610), insofar as it also focuses on "the quackeries and impostures of a professed fortune-teller", nevertheless "to mention it in the same breath" as the latter work "would be ridiculous."

Algernon Charles Swinburne, writing in 1908, suggested that the play evidenced Heywood's dramatic powers at their height and was one of the best examples of a comedy of intrigue. The dramatic structure of the first and last scenes in particular drew his admiration:

The culmination of accumulating evidence by which the rascal hero is ultimately overwhelmed and put to shame, driven from lie to lie and reduced from retractation to retractation as witness after witness starts up against him from every successive corner of the witch's dwelling, is as masterly in management of stage effect as any contrivance of the kind in any later and more famous comedy: nor can I remember a more spirited and vivid opening to any play than the quarrelling scene among the gamblers with which this one breaks out at once into life-like action, full of present interest and promise of more to come.

He was less convinced, though, by the way in which the end of the play allows "the triumphant escape of a villanous old impostor and baby-farmer from the condign punishments due to her misdeeds"; he regarded this failure to punish the Wise Woman as a violation of the sense of poetic justice, which had been perpetrated, he argued, for the sake of a satisfying conclusion. He noted a similarity between the protagonist Chartley and that of How a Man May Choose a Good Wife from a Bad (1602), which he offered in support of the claim of Heywood's authorship of the earlier comedy. Chartley was, in his estimation, "an abject ruffian of unredeemed and irredeemable rascality."

M. C. Bradbrook, writing in 1955, didn't judge Chartley so harshly—he is "not a serious character" and his "repentance is boyish and unabashed". She, too, admired the ingenuity and "exceptionally fine sense of construction" achieved in the final scene. She considered the play to be a particularly farcical treatment of the device of the prodigal son, the prototype for which is found in How a Man May Choose a Good Wife from a Bad. This device usually involves the prodigal "having to choose between a faithful wife and a wanton mistress, choosing wrongly at first and later being brought to repentance." In Bradbrook's account, the play belongs to a more general shift within English popular comedy away from adventure stories and towards a greater interest in those focused on love.

Kathleen E. McLuskie also draws attention to the final scene, which she compares with the complex staging involved in the eavesdropping scene in Shakespeare's romantic comedy Love's Labour's Lost (c. 1595) and the brothel scene in Thomas Dekker and John Webster's city comedy Westward Ho (1604). She links the dramatic strategy of The Wise Woman of Hoxton with Dekker's The Honest Whore (1604), insofar as both transpose the marriage-problem plot from domestic tragedy into a city comedy setting. The resolution in Heywood's play, though, arises from the cross-dressed heroine, rather than the "supervisory men". She detects a contrast between a familiar urban morality at work throughout the first act and the setting of act two, where the resolution will be effected—outside the Wise Woman's house in Hoxton, "in which the dangerous and transgressive potentialities of the city comedy world are offered and avoided." The play attempts to navigate significant distinctions within the culture of Jacobean London, McLuskie argues, insofar as it seeks to relate to and to distinguish itself from both popular culture and cultures of learning. The exuberant thread of a "celebration of the potentialities of the new London" and its commercial values complicates the traditional moral scheme of the play, she suggests. She notes that the play does not focus on any use of magic by the Wise Woman, but rather on the more familiar comic conventions of disguise. Cross-dressing, in particular, "released the heroine for a more active role in the plotting, making her the subject as much as the object of action", since it "removes the character from both the domestic arena, where her action would be restricted to the roles of a wife, and the world of city comedy where her sexuality would be at issue." McLuskie relates this dramatic strategy to Thomas Middleton and Dekker's The Roaring Girl (c. 1607).

Sonia Massai identifies Heywood's use of stock characters familiar from his other plays, such as the dissolute youth, the pedantic schoolmaster, and the foolish old father, as well as relating The Wise Woman of Hoxton to a number of other contemporary plays that included a Griselda-type heroine: All's Well That Ends Well, Measure for Measure, and How a Man May Choose a Good Wife from a Bad. The play also frequently makes use of references to specific geographical locations in London, she notices, which gives it a sense of immediacy and presence in the city.

== Sources ==
- Bradbrook, M. C. 1955. The Growth and Structure of Elizabethan Comedy. London: Chatto & Windus.
- Chalmers, James. 2016. "The Sea Voyage: On Directing a Read Not Dead Staged Reading." [A]merican [S]hakespeare [C]enter Education. Staunton, VA: ASC Education. 5 June 2016. Web. Accessed 13 August 2016.
- Heywood, Thomas. 2002. The Wise Woman of Hoxton. Ed. Sonia Massai. Globe Quartos ser. London: Nick Hern. ISBN 1-854-59707-8.
- Howard, Jean E. 1994. The Stage and Social Struggle in Early Modern England. London: Routledge. ISBN 0-415-04258-5.
- Massai, Sonia. 2002. "Editor's Introduction" in Heywood (2002, xi-xiv).
- McLuskie, Kathleen E. 1994. Dekker & Heywood: Professional Dramatists. English Dramatists ser. London: Macmillan. ISBN 0-333-46237-8.
- Merchant, Paul, ed. 1996. Thomas Heywood: Three Marriage Plays. Revels Plays Companion Library ser. Manchester: Manchester University Press. ISBN 9780719022210.
- Orgel, Stephen. 1996. Impersonations: The Performance of Gender in Shakespeare's England. Cambridge: Cambridge University Press. ISBN 0-521-56842-0.
- Partridge, Eric. 1968. Shakespeare's Bawdy. 3rd ed. London: Routledge. ISBN 0-415-25400-0.
- Swinburne, Algernon Charles. 1908. The Age of Shakespeare. London: Harper.
- Symonds, John Addington. 1888. "Thomas Heywood." In Verity (1888, vii–xxxii).
- Verity, A. Wilson, ed. 1888. The Best Plays of Thomas Heywood. The Mermaid ser. London: Unwin.
