= Five Gallants =

Five Gallants may refer to:

- Your Five Gallants, a 1607 English comedy play by Thomas Middleton
- The Seven Heroes and Five Gallants, a 19th-century Chinese chivalric novel
