= Clinton Atkinson =

16th-century British pirate

Clinton Atkinson (also known as Clinton) was a 16th-century British pirate, active in the 1580s in the sea surrounding Devon and Cornwall in southwestern Britain.

Clinton and his confederate Thomas Walton were widely reported on at the time with, three broadsheet accounts being published shortly after their hanging in 1583. Thomas Heywood documents their lives and deaths in his Fortune by Land and Sea and there was also a two-part pamphlet published about them -A True Relation of the Lives and Deaths of the two most Famous English Pyrats, Purser, and Clinton.

In common with other petty pirates of his region and time, Atkinson maintained close relationships with local landowners such as John Killigrew of Arnwick, in order to ensure safe harbor for the disembarkation of stolen goods. When Atkinson was captured in 1583 and imprisoned in Exeter jail, his connections ensured a friendly testimonial from the mayor, which was read at his trial. Despite the mayor's endorsement, Atkinson was sentenced to death and transported to London for execution. His death is recorded in the 1583 parish records for St Botolph's Aldersgate, near Wapping Dock, which read:

"Clinton Atkinson some tyme a housekeeper & dwelling at grace church street & sold haberdashery wares, was for piracy executed at wapping 31 August 1583."

== Notes ==
=== Bibliography ===
- Forbes, Thomas R. (September 1970). "Life and Death in Shakespeare's London: Parish records yield important new data on infant and child death rates, plague fatalities, accidents, murders, executions – and a vivid picture of daily life". American Scientist. 58 (5). The Scientific Research Society: 520. JSTOR 27829240.
- Mathews, David (July 1924). "The Cornish and Welsh Pirates in the Reign of Elizabeth". The English Historical Review. 39 (155). Oxford University Press: 346. JSTOR 552118.
