= Fortune by Land and Sea =

Play

Fortune by Land and Sea is a Jacobean era stage play, a romantic melodrama written by Thomas Heywood and William Rowley. The play has attracted the attention of modern critics for its juxtaposition of the themes of primogeniture and piracy.

== Publication ==
Fortune by Land and Sea was entered into the Stationers' Register on 20 June 1655, and was published later that year in a quarto by the booksellers John Sweeting and Robert Pollard. This poorly-printed quarto was the only edition of the play to appear during the 17th century.

== Date and performance ==
Scholarship has suggested a range of possible dates for the play. E. K. Chambers located it in the 1607–09 period. The title page of the 1655 quarto states that the drama was acted "by the Queen's servants", that is by Queen Anne's Men at the Red Bull Theatre. Heywood was a key member of that company as both actor and playwright, and Rowley was writing for them too at that time. But while being open to this earlier dating, analysis by Martin Wiggins and Catherine Richardson suggests limits of 1607-9 and 1619–26, with a 'best guess' of 1623 owing to Rowley's identifiable collaborations with Heywood during the 1620s.

== Genre ==
The 1655 quarto calls the play a tragicomedy, though it differs from the specific genre as it was developed by John Fletcher and his imitators during the Jacobean and Caroline eras. Instead the play belongs to the older tradition of romantic adventure that both Heywood and Rowley exploited in their playwriting careers, in works like Heywood's The Four Prentices of London (c. 1592), and The Travels of the Three English Brothers (1607), which Rowley wrote with George Wilkins and John Day.

== Subject matter ==
The play contrasts the fortunes of its characters in two radically different domains of experience: those living traditional English lives on land are ruled by the strictures of the primogeniture system, while escape to sea means a life of anarchic freedom, danger, and opportunity. Heywood exploited the subject of piracy in other works, notably his two-part play The Fair Maid of the West. In Fortune by Land and Sea, the playwrights based their plot on actual events from the reign of Queen Elizabeth, as recounted in a 1583 pamphlet. The dramatists were looking back to an Elizabethan age of optimism and expansionism, from a Jacobean period that conspicuously lacked those traits.

== Synopsis ==
The play relates the story of two interlocked rural families – two patriarchs, known simply as Old Forrest and Old Harding, each of whom has three children. Forrest has two sons and a daughter, and Harding has three sons. Through the course of the play, it is revealed that the families have endured contrasting reversals of fortune: when the two patriarchs were young men, the Forrest family was prosperous and land-rich, while the Hardings were their tenant farmers. Over the course of the two men's lives, the Forrests were reduced to comparative poverty while the Hardings flourished. Their contrasting fortunes may be the result of the two men's characters: Old Forrest is a mild-mannered and moral gentleman, while Old Harding is grasping and ruthless.

In the opening scene, Old Forrest tries dissuade his headstrong elder son Frank from carousing with his fair-weather friends, a "quarrelsome gentleman" named Rainsford and his hangers-on Foster and Goodwin. Frank Forrest ignores his father's sententious advice; but during the evening Rainsford insults Old Forrest to his son's face, calling him a "fool" and "dotard." The two draw their swords and fight, and Frank Forrest is killed. His family recover his body, but cannot prove the crime against Rainsford, who has powerful connections with the nobility.

Meanwhile, Old Harding has just married a new young wife. Harding's younger sons William and John, unhappy at this development, are hostile to their new stepmother, until Old Harding makes his displeasure plain; then the two young men grow more respectful. When Old Harding learns that his eldest son Philip has married Susan Forrest, a young woman of virtue but no dowry, he rejects the match and refuses the young couple all support. To survive, Philip and Susan must become servants in Old Harding's household. The new Mrs. Harding treats the couple with compassion, though brothers William and John are harsher toward their fallen older brother and his wife. Another Harding family servant is the play's Clown, who provides the comic relief.

Old Forrest's second son, known simply as Young Forrest, seeks out Rainsford and challenges him to a duel. The two fight, and Rainsford is killed. Young Forrest is pursued by the authorities and by Rainsford's friends Goodwin and Foster; fleeing, he leaps the Hardings' garden wall and confronts Mrs. Harding. Hearing his story, she feels compassion for him; she conceals him for a week, then sends him to her brother, a London merchant. He is similarly taken by Young Forrest's good nature, and helps the young man to travel abroad on one of his ships. The Merchant leaves for a voyage of his own shortly after.

At sea, the Merchant's ship is waylaid and overcome by two notorious English pirates, Clinton Atkinson and his associate Purser. Young Forrest has the opposite success: he is elected to lead the crew of his vessel when their captain dies, and conducts a successful campaign against Spanish shipping, taking several prizes. Eventually Young Forrest and his crew engage Purser and Clinton in a sea fight, and emerge triumphant; Young Forrest releases the Merchant from captivity and restores his goods and profits.

At home, Philip and Susan must endure the oppression of service in the Harding house. The Clown almost tricks Foster and Goodwin into loaning Philip Harding the money he needs to set up his own farm; but Philip's naive honesty makes the trick fall through. Old Harding is prepared to sign the papers that will disinherit son Philip permanently and settle his estate upon younger brothers John and William; but a sailor arrives with the news of the Merchant's original capture by the pirates. Old Harding is heavily invested in the Merchant's venture, and the bad news strikes him so hard that he collapses.

The Clown brings word of the old man's sudden death with comic distress:

O, my master, my master! what shall I do for my poor master? the kind churl is departed! never did poor hard-hearted wretch pass out of the world so like a lamb! alas! for my poor, usuring, extortioning master! many an old widow hast thou turned into the street, and many an orphan made beg for bread! Oh, my sweet, cruel, kind, pitiless, loving, hard-hearted master! he's dead; he's dead; he's gone; he's fled; and now full low must hang his head! Oh, my sweet vile, kind, flinty, mild, uncharitable master!

Old Harding has died before the inheritance documents are signed. From the lowly position of a servant, Philip Harding now inherits his father's estate, leaving his younger brothers dependent upon his goodwill.

Better news, of Young Forrest's triumph and the Merchant's rescue, quickly arrives; far from taking a large loss, the Harding estate is now wealthier than ever. Philip and Susan are grateful to Mrs. Harding for the favor she showed them in their servitude. By law, Mrs. Harding receives a third of Old Harding's estate, and her investment in her brother's voyage has made her even richer. Young Forrest earns a pardon for Rainsford's death through his defeat of the pirates.

Purser and Clinton are shown on their way to execution; they reminisce romantically about the drama and success of their careers in piracy, before they are led off to the gallows. Young Forrest and the Merchant return home to a welcome from their Forrest and Harding relations; the impetuous Young Forrest asks Mrs. Harding to marry him almost as soon as he meets her. The play ends with a general reconciliation; the two younger Harding brothers, and Goodwin and Foster too, have all been reduced to beggary by loose living and ill luck – but the generous and forgiving Philip Harding offers to relieve their wants.
