= A Maidenhead Well Lost =

Dark comedy by Thomas Heywood

A Pleasant Comedy, called A Maidenhead Well Lost
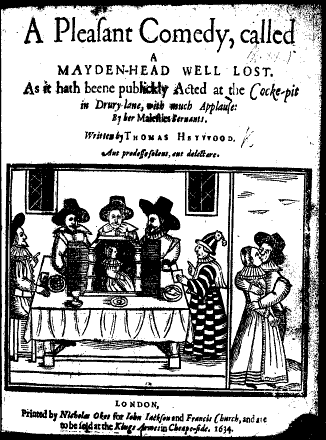
- Original language: English
- Written by: Thomas Heywood
- Characters: The Duke of Milan; Julia, his daughter; Stroza, Secretary to the Duke; The Prince of Parma; Widow of General Sforza; Lauretta, her daughter; The Clown, servant to Lauretta and her mother; A soldier of Sforza's; Three maimed soldiers; A Lord of Milan; Attendants and other lords; The Duke of Florence; The Prince of Florence; Monsieur, Tutor to the Prince; A Huntsman; A Lord of Florence
- Genre: Comedy
- Setting: Milan and Florence

Premiere
- Date: 1634
- Place: The Cockpit (aka The Phoenix), London, England

A Pleasant Comedy, called A Maidenhead Well Lost is a dark comedy set in Italy; it was written and published by Thomas Heywood in 1634 and performed at The Cockpit by Queen Henrietta's Men in that same year. The plot centres on Julia, the daughter of the Duke of Milan, who finds herself pregnant before she is officially married to the Prince of Parma. A sub-plot of the play is the story of Lauretta, who finds herself banished from the court of Milan and ends up falling in love with the Prince of Florence.

== Synopsis ==
=== Actus Primus ===
The first act of the play opens with the Duke of Milan's secretary, Stroza, having a conversation with Julia. During this conversation, Stroza hints very broadly that the Prince of Parma, Julia's fiancé, has taken Lauretta as his mistress. Although she does not, at first, believe him, Stroza manages to convince her that it is true and Julia goes off lamenting that she ever slept with the Prince. Stroza then encounters the Prince of Parma, who is looking for Julia, and takes the opportunity to suggest to Parma that Julia has not been faithful to him. Lauretta is then confronted by Julia, who has her and her mother banished from the court of Milan for her alleged crime of sleeping with Parma. She and Parma fight about it, and the Act ends with Lauretta and her mother discovering the death of General Sforza and realising that they are now destitute.

=== Actus Secundus ===
Act two begins with Parma receiving a letter from Julia, in which she reveals to him that she is with child. Parma, believing her to be unfaithful, refuses to believe the child is his and calls off their engagement. Julia is then forced to reveal her condition to her father, and he tells her not to tell anyone else. Meanwhile, Lauretta, her mother, and the Clown have made their way into the forest near Florence, and they are found by the Prince of Florence who sets them up in a nearby hunting lodge. The Prince of Florence falls in love with Lauretta at first sight, and vows to take care of them. At the end of this act, a dumb show is put on, depicting the birth of Julia and Parma's son, who is then given to Stroza. He takes it into the woods and leaves it there to die, but Parma finds the child and cares for it, beginning to suspect Stroza of orchestrating the problems.

=== Actus Tertius ===
The third act sees the Duke of Milan and his advisors trying to choose a husband for Julia, finally settling on the eligible Prince of Florence. Stroza is sent as an ambassador to Florence to negotiate the marriage contract, while Lauretta and the Prince of Florence fall more in love. The Prince knows he cannot marry Lauretta, however, because she is not of noble blood, nor is she wealthy enough to be a good match, and he has no choice but to agree to marry Julia per his father's wishes. Parma discovers this and, determined to marry Julia himself, sends a letter to the Prince of Florence telling him that Julia is not a virgin and that she is already betrothed to another, creating confusion for the Prince of Florence. The act finishes with the Clown happening across Stroza, through which Stroza discovers that Lauretta and her mother are living nearby.

=== Actus Quartus ===
Act Four begins with another dumb show, this one depicting the wedding of Julia and the Prince of Florence. After the ceremony is performed, the Prince announces his doubt of Julia's chastity, proclaiming that if she is not found to be a virgin that night, then the marriage will not be valid. The Duke of Milan and Stroza panic about this until Stroza works out a plan. He offers Lauretta money to change places with Julia for the night, thereby tricking the Prince of Florence into believing that Julia is a virgin. At first resistant, Lauretta finally agrees out of love for the Prince, and there is a third dumb show portraying the switch of Julia with Lauretta.

=== Actus Quintus ===
Act five holds the climax of the play, opening with the Duke of Milan and Stroza waiting for Lauretta to come out of the Prince's bedchamber. Once she does, and she is alone, she reveals that the Prince of Florence has given her a ring and the document promising the full sum of Julia's dower. She keeps these for herself instead of giving them to Julia, and uses them later in the act to reveal to the Prince that she was the one whom he slept with that night. The Prince, armed with this knowledge, asks Julia to present these items to him later that day, and when she cannot, the switch is revealed, and Stroza is outed as the instigator of all the problems. Outraged by Stroza's machinations and his attempt at "ruining" Lauretta, the Prince of Florence's tutor duels with Stroza. Stroza is wounded in the fight, and then the Duke of Milan suddenly decides to forgive him. Also in the climax of the play, Parma delivers Julia's child to the Prince of Florence, claiming that whoever weds the mother should care for the child. When it is discovered that Julia has been faithful to Parma the entire time, he takes Julia as his wife and the Prince of Florence takes Lauretta as his.

== Themes and motifs ==
Virginity/Chastity
This is obviously a very important theme of the play. A Maidenhead Well Lost is about preserving the sanctity of marriage and remaining faithful to one another.

Marriage and Faithfulness
In A Maidenhead Well Lost, the marriage ceremony is almost an afterthought. Those involved are far more interested in who has slept with whom to determine who has been faithful to their partner.

== Genre ==
Although the original title of the play designates A Maidenhead Well Lost as a comedy, it can also be called a domestic drama because it depicts normal, everyday occurrences such as engagements, sex, arguments between lovers, and childbirth. The difference here, however, is that A Maidenhead Well Lost is not about the middle or lower classes, but the nobility. Thomas Heywood was known for his domestic dramas, and he was also known for creating domestic dramas about the nobility and even royalty.

== Intertexts ==
In the preface to the play, Heywood comments on "that most horrible Histriomastix." Histriomastix is an anti-theatrical discourse written by William Prynne. In it, Prynne attacks Heywood and many other dramatists, as well as the immorality of the theatre. This was likely a response to Heywood's own discourse, An Apology to Actors, which was published a few years before Prynne wrote his.
