= The Knight of the Burning Pestle =

1607 play by Francis Beaumont

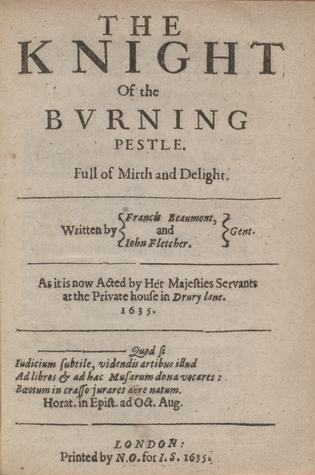
Title page from a 1635 edition of The Knight of the Burning Pestle.

The Knight of the Burning Pestle is a play in five acts by Francis Beaumont, first performed at Blackfriars Theatre in 1607 and published in a quarto in 1613. It is the earliest whole parody (or pastiche) play in English. The play is a satire on chivalric romances in general, similar to Don Quixote, and a parody of Thomas Heywood's The Four Prentices of London and Thomas Dekker's The Shoemaker's Holiday. It breaks the fourth wall from its outset.

== Text ==
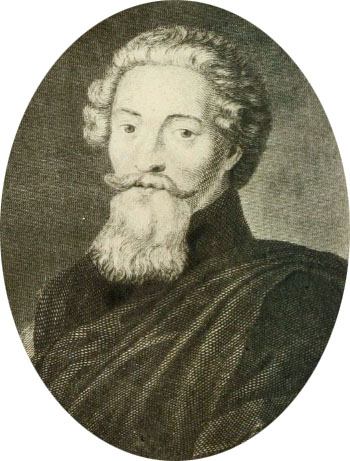
Francis Beaumont, circa 1600

It is most likely that the play was written for the child actors at Blackfriars Theatre, where John Marston had previously had plays produced. In addition to the textual history testifying to a Blackfriars origin, there are multiple references within the text to Marston, to the actors as children (notably from the Citizen's Wife, who seems to recognise the actors from their school), and other indications that the performance took place in a house known for biting satire and sexual innuendo. Blackfriars specialised in satire, according to Andrew Gurr (quoted in Hattaway, ix), and Michael Hattaway suggests that the dissonance of the youth of the players and the gravity of their roles combined with the multiple internal references to holiday revels because the play had a Shrovetide or midsummer's day first production (Hattaway xxi and xiii). The play is certainly carnivalesque, but the date of the first performance is purely speculative. The second quarto publication came in 1635, with a third the same year. The play was omitted from the first Beaumont and Fletcher folio of 1647 but included in the second folio of 1679. The play was later widely thought to be the joint work of Beaumont and John Fletcher.

== Characters ==
- Speaker of the Prologue
- A Citizen (George)
- His Wife (Nell)
- Rafe, his Apprentice
- Boys
- Venturewell, a Merchant
- Humphrey
- Old Merrythought
- Michael Merrythought, his son
- Jasper Merrythought, another son
- Host of an Inn
- Tapster
- Barber
- Three Men, supposed captives
- Sergeant
- William Hammerton
- George Greengoose
- Soldiers, and Attendants
- Luce, Daughter of Venturewell
- Mistress Merrythought
- Woman, supposed a captive
- Pompiona, Daughter of the King of Moldavia
- Susan, Cobbler's maid in Milk Street

== Plot ==
Scene: London and the neighbouring Country, except for Act IV Scene ii which is set in Moldavia.

As a play called The London Merchant is about to be performed, a Citizen and his Wife 'in the audience' interrupt to complain that the play will misrepresent the middle-class citizens of the city. The Citizen, who identifies himself as a grocer, climbs onto the stage, bringing his Wife up to sit with him. They demand that the players put on a play of their own choosing and suggest that the Citizen's own apprentice, Rafe, should be given a part. Rafe demonstrates his dramatic skills by quoting Shakespeare, and a part is created for him as a knight errant. He refers to himself as a 'Grocer Errant' and has a burning pestle on his shield as a heraldic device.

This meta-plot is intercut with the main plot of the interrupted play, The London Merchant, in which Jasper Merrythought, the merchant's apprentice, is in love with his master's daughter, Luce, and must elope with her to save her from marriage to Humphrey, a City man of fashion. Luce pretends to Humphrey that she has made an unusual vow: she will only marry a man who has the spirit to run away with her. She knows that Humphrey will immediately inform her father. She intends to fake an elopement with Humphrey, knowing that her father will allow this to happen, but then to drop him and meet up with Jasper.

Meanwhile, Jasper's mother has decided to leave her husband, Old Merrythought, who has spent all his savings in drinking and partying. When Jasper seeks his mother's help, she rejects him in favour of his younger brother Michael. She tells Michael that she has jewellery that she can sell to live on while he learns a trade. They leave Merrythought, and lose themselves in a wood where she misplaces her jewellery. Jasper arrives to meet Luce and finds the jewels. Luce and Humphrey appear. Jasper, as planned, knocks over Humphrey and escapes with Luce. The Grocer Errant arrives, believing when he sees the distraught Mrs Merrythought that he has met a damsel in distress. He takes the Merrythoughts to an inn, expecting the host to accommodate them chivalrously without charge. When the host demands payment, the Grocer Errant is perplexed. The host tells him there are people in distress he must save from an evil barber named Barbaroso (a barber surgeon who is attempting cures on people with venereal diseases). He effects a daring rescue of Barbaroso's patients.

The Citizen and his Wife demand more chivalric and exotic adventures for Rafe, and a scene is created in which the Grocer Errant must go to Moldavia where he meets a princess who falls in love with him. But he says that he has already plighted his troth to Susan, a cobbler's maid in Milk Street. The princess reluctantly lets him go, lamenting that she cannot come to England, as she has always dreamed of tasting English beer.

Jasper tests Luce's love by pretending he intends to kill her because of the way her father has treated him. She is shocked, but declares her devotion to him. Humphrey and her father arrive with other men. They attack Jasper and drag Luce away. The merchant locks Luce in her room. Jasper feigns death and writes a letter to the merchant with a pretend dying apology for his behaviour. The coffin, with Jasper hiding within, is carried to the merchant's house, where Luce laments his demise. Jasper rises and explains his plan to save her from marriage to Humphrey: Luce is to take Jasper's place in the coffin while Jasper remains hidden in the house. When the merchant enters, Jasper pretends to be his own ghost and scares the merchant into expelling Humphrey. A chastened Mrs Merrythought returns to her husband. Jasper reveals he is still alive. The merchant asks for Old Merrythought's forgiveness and consents to Jasper's match with Luce.

The Citizen and his Wife demand that Rafe's part in the drama should also have an appropriate ending, and he is given a heroic death scene. Everyone is satisfied.

== Reception ==
The play was a failure when it was first performed, although it won approval over the next generation or two. In Richard Brome's The Sparagus Garden (1635), the character Rebecca desires to see it "above all plays." Beaumont's comedy was performed at Court by Queen Henrietta's Men on 28 February 1636 (new style).

== Revivals ==
=== London revivals ===
Noël Coward as Rafe in 1920

The play was revived in London in 1904, with Nigel Playfair in the principal role of Rafe. In 1920 the young Noël Coward starred as Rafe in a Birmingham Repertory Theatre production which transferred to the West End. The Times called the play "the jolliest thing in London". In 1932 the play was staged at the Old Vic, with Ralph Richardson as Rafe and Sybil Thorndike as the Citizen's Wife. The Greenwich Theatre presented the play in 1975, with Gordon Reid as Rafe. The Royal Shakespeare Company performed it in 1981, with Timothy Spall in the lead. In a 2005 revival at the Barbican Theatre Rafe was played by Spall's son Rafe, who was named after the character in the play. The play was performed as part of the opening season of the Sam Wanamaker Theatre in 2014.

=== American productions ===
In 1957 the Old Globe Theatre in San Diego presented The Knight of the Burning Pestle. The American Shakespeare Center (then the Shenandoah Shakespeare Express) staged it in 1999 and revived it in 2003 at the Blackfriars Playhouse in Staunton, Virginia, a recreation of Shakespeare's Blackfriars Theatre. In 1974 the Long Wharf Theatre in New Haven, CT, presented a shortened adaptation by Brooks Jones that turned it into a musical comedy with new songs by Peter Schickele. The American Shakespeare Center's "Rough, Rude, and Boisterous tour" of 2009 to 2010 also included the play. The Theater at Monmouth staged the play in the summer of 2013. In June 2016, Theatre Pro Rata, a small professional theater in St. Paul, Minnesota, staged a 90-minute version of the play with eight actors, four in the play–within–the–play playing multiple roles. With a cast of 12, The Independent Shakespeare Company of Los Angeles staged a full performance in Griffith Park in July 2022. In 2023, the play is being presented at the Lucille Lortel Theatre by Red Bull Theater in association with Fiasco Theater in the first major New York revival in over 50 years.

=== 1938 TV film ===
A 90-minute television film version was broadcast by BBC Television on 19 and 30 December 1938. The film had music by Frederic Austin and starred Frederick Ranalow as Merrythought, Hugh E. Wright as The Citizen, Margaret Yarde as Wife, Manning Whiley as Tim and Alex McCrindle as George Greengoose.

== See also ==
- 1613 in literature
