= City comedy =

Genre of comedy in the English early modern theatre

City comedy, also known as citizen comedy, is a genre of comedy in the English early modern theatre.

== Definition ==
Our Scene is London, 'cause we would make known,
No country's mirth is better than our own.
No clime breeds better matter, for your whore,
Bawd, squire, imposter, many persons more

— Ben Jonson, The Alchemist (1610).

Emerging from Ben Jonson's late-Elizabethan comedies of humours (1598–1599), the conventions of city comedy developed rapidly in the first decade of the Jacobean era, as one playwright's innovations were soon adopted by others, such that by about 1605 the new genre was fully established. Its principal playwrights were Jonson himself, Thomas Middleton, and John Marston, though many others also contributed to its development, including Thomas Heywood, Thomas Dekker, John Day, and John Webster. Once the companies of boy players—the Children of Paul's and the Children of the Chapel—had resumed public performances from 1600 onwards, most of their plays were city comedies. The closest that William Shakespeare's plays come to the genre is the slightly earlier The Merry Wives of Windsor (c. 1597), which is his only play set entirely in England; it avoids the caustic satire of city comedy, however, in preference for a more bourgeois mode (with its dual romantic plots governed by socio-economics, not love or sex), while its setting, Windsor, is a town rather than a city.

In contrast to the adventurous chronicles of Elizabethan comedy, such as Thomas Dekker's The Shoemaker's Holiday (1599) or George Peele's The Old Wives’ Tale (c. 1590), or the intricately plotted romantic comedies of Shakespeare and John Lyly, city comedy was more realistic (excluding magical or marvellous elements) and sharp and satirical in tone. It portrayed a broad range of characters from different ranks (often focused on citizens), employing "deeds and language such as men do use", as Jonson put it, and was usually set in London.

During the Tudor period the Reformation had produced a gradual shift to Protestantism and much of London passed from church to private ownership. The Royal Exchange was founded in this period. Mercantilism grew, and monopoly trading companies such as the East India Company were established, with trade expanding to the New World. London became the principal North Sea port, with migrants arriving from England and abroad. The population rose from an estimated 50,000 in 1530 to about 225,000 in 1605. City comedies depict London as a hotbed of vice and folly; in particular, Jonson's Epicoene, Middleton's A Trick to Catch the Old One and A Chaste Maid in Cheapside, and Marston's The Dutch Courtesan.

Verna Foster has argued that John Ford's 'Tis Pity She's a Whore (c. 1629–1633) re-works many of the features of city comedy within a tragic drama.

== List of city comedies ==
- Every Man in his Humour (1598), by Ben Jonson
- The Family of Love (c. 1602), by Thomas Middleton
- The Wise Woman of Hoxton (c. 1604), by Thomas Heywood
- A Trick to Catch the Old One (c. 1604), by Thomas Middleton
- The Dutch Courtesan (c. 1604), by John Marston
- Westward Ho (1604), by Thomas Dekker and John Webster
- Eastward Ho (1605), by George Chapman, Ben Jonson, and John Marston
- Northward Ho (1605), by Thomas Dekker and John Webster
- Michaelmas Term (c. 1605), by Thomas Middleton
- A Mad World, My Masters (c. 1605), by Thomas Middleton
- Cupid's Whirligig (1607), by Edward Sharpham
- Your Five Gallants (c. 1607), by Thomas Middleton
- Ram Alley, or Merry Tricks (1608), by Lording Barry
- Epicœne, or The Silent Woman (1609), by Ben Jonson
- The Alchemist (1610), by Ben Jonson
- The Roaring Girl (c. 1611), by Thomas Middleton and Thomas Dekker
- A Chaste Maid in Cheapside (c. 1611), by Thomas Middleton
- Bartholomew Fair (1614), by Ben Jonson
- Anything for a Quiet Life (c. 1621), by Thomas Middleton (and, possibly, John Webster)
- A New Way to Pay Old Debts (c. 1621), by Philip Massinger
- The City Madam (c. 1632), by Philip Massinger

== See also ==
- English drama
- Comedy of humours
- Comedy of intrigue

== Sources ==
- Banham, Martin, ed. 1998. The Cambridge Guide to Theatre. Cambridge: Cambridge University Press. ISBN 0-521-43437-8.
- Barroll, J. Leeds, Alexander Leggatt, Richard Hosley, and Alvin Kernan, eds. 1975. The Revels History of Drama in English. Vol. 3 (1576–1613). London: Methuen. ISBN 0-416-81380-1
- Bradbrook, M. C. 1955. The Growth and Structure of Elizabethan Comedy. London: Chatto & Windus.
- Brockett, Oscar G. and Franklin J. Hildy. 2003. History of the Theatre. Ninth edition, International edition. Boston: Allyn and Bacon. ISBN 0-205-41050-2.
- Burgon, John William and E. Wilson. 1839. The Life and Times of Sir Thomas Gresham, Founder of the Royal Exchange. Vol. 2. London: Robert Jennings. Available online at the Internet Archive.
- Donaldson, Ian. 1997. Jonson's Magic Houses: Essays in Interpretation. Oxford: Clarendon. ISBN 0198183941.
- Foster, Verna. 1988. "'Tis Pity She's a Whore as City Tragedy." In John Ford: Critical Revisions. Ed. Michael Neill. Cambridge: Cambridge University Press. 181–200. ISBN 0521331420.
- Gibbons, Brian. 1980. Jacobean City Comedy: A Study of the Satiric Plays by Jonson, Marston and Middleton. 2nd rev. ed. London: Methuen. ISBN 0-416-73460-X.
- Gurr, Andrew. 1992. The Shakespearean Stage 1574–1642. Third ed. Cambridge: Cambridge University Press. ISBN 0-521-42240-X.
- Hampton-Reeves, Stuart. 2007. The Shakespeare Handbooks: Measure for Measure. The Shakespeare Handbooks ser. New York: Macmillan. ISBN 1-4039-4417-2.
- Howard, Jean E. 2001. "Shakespeare and the London City Comedy." Shakespeare Studies 39: 1–21.
- Knights, L. C. 1937. Drama and Society in the Age of Jonson. Harmondsworth: Penguin.
- Laroque, François. 2015. "Magic, Manipulation and Misrule in Doctor Faustus and Measure for Measure." In The Circulation of Knowledge in Early Modern English Literature. Ed. Sophie Chiari. London: Routledge. 123–132. ISBN 978-1315614724.
- Leggatt, Alexander. 1973. Citizen Comedy in the Age of Shakespeare. Toronto: University of Toronto Press.
- Leinwand, Theodore B. 1986. The City Staged: Jacobean Comedy, 1603–1613. Madison: University of Wisconsin Press.
- McLuskie, Kathleen E. 1994. Dekker & Heywood: Professional Dramatists. English Dramatists ser. London: Macmillan. ISBN 0-333-46237-8.
- Orlin, Lena Cowen. 2008. "Shakespearean Comedy and Material Life." A Companion to Shakespeare's Works. Vol. 3: The Comedies. Ed. Richard Dutton and Jean E. Howard. Blackwell Companions to Literature and Culture ser. Oxford: Blackwell. 159–181. ISBN 9780470997291.
- Pevsner, Nikolaus. 1962. London I: The Cities of London and Westminster. 2nd rev. ed. The Buildings of England ser. Harmondsworth: Penguin. ISBN 0140710116.
