= Third Murderer =

Character in Shakespeare's tragedy Macbeth

- Macbeth character
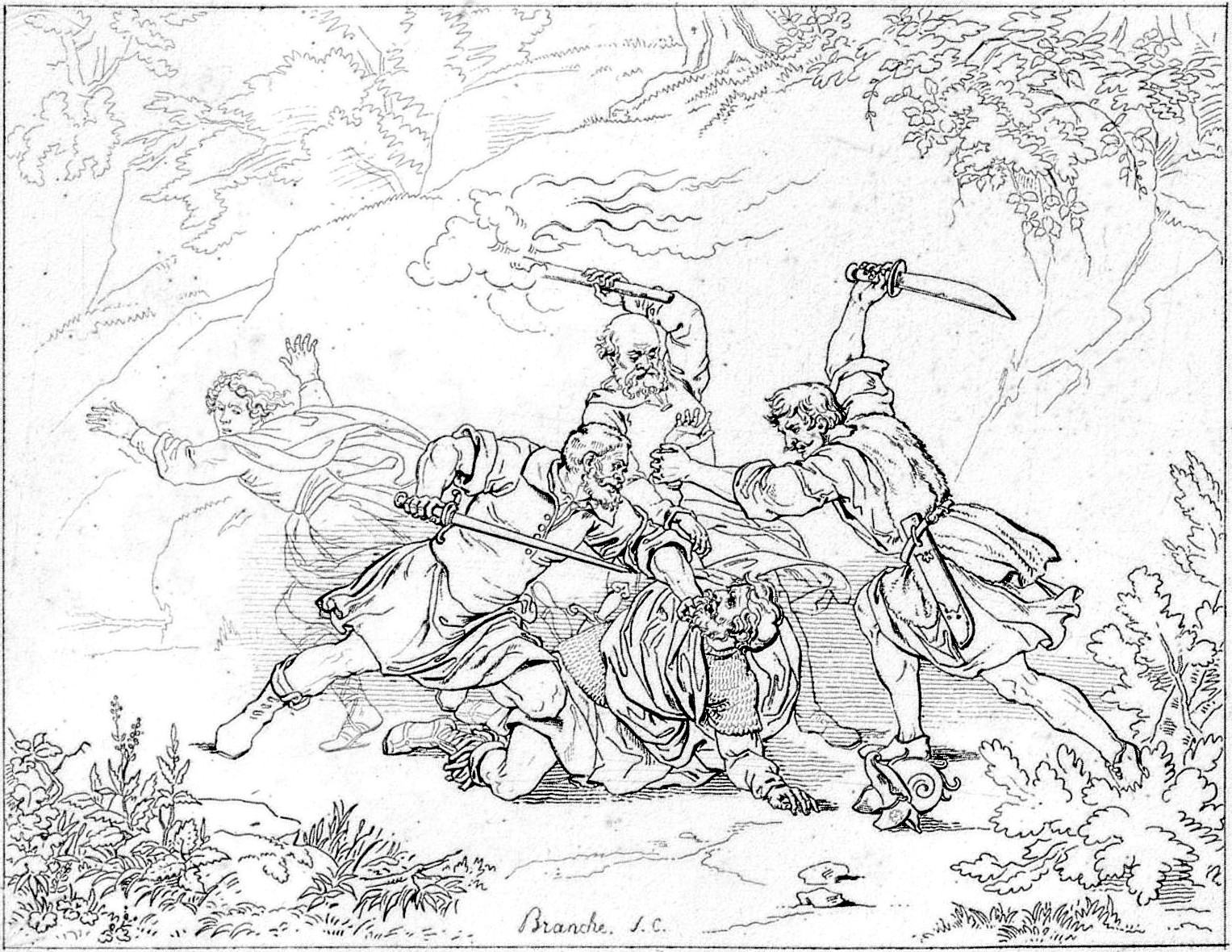
- Illustration of the three murderers from the 1830 French book Galerie de Shakspeare
- Created by: William Shakespeare

In-universe information
- Affiliation: First Murderer, Second Murderer, Macbeth

The Third Murderer is a character in William Shakespeare's tragedy Macbeth (1606). He appears in one scene (3.3), joining the First and Second Murderers to assassinate Banquo and Fleance, at the orders of Macbeth.

The Third Murderer is not present when Macbeth speaks to the First and Second Murderers, and is not expected by his partners. Although the Third Murderer is a small role, the identity of the character has been the subject of scholarly debate, and various productions have equated him with other characters.

== Role in the play ==
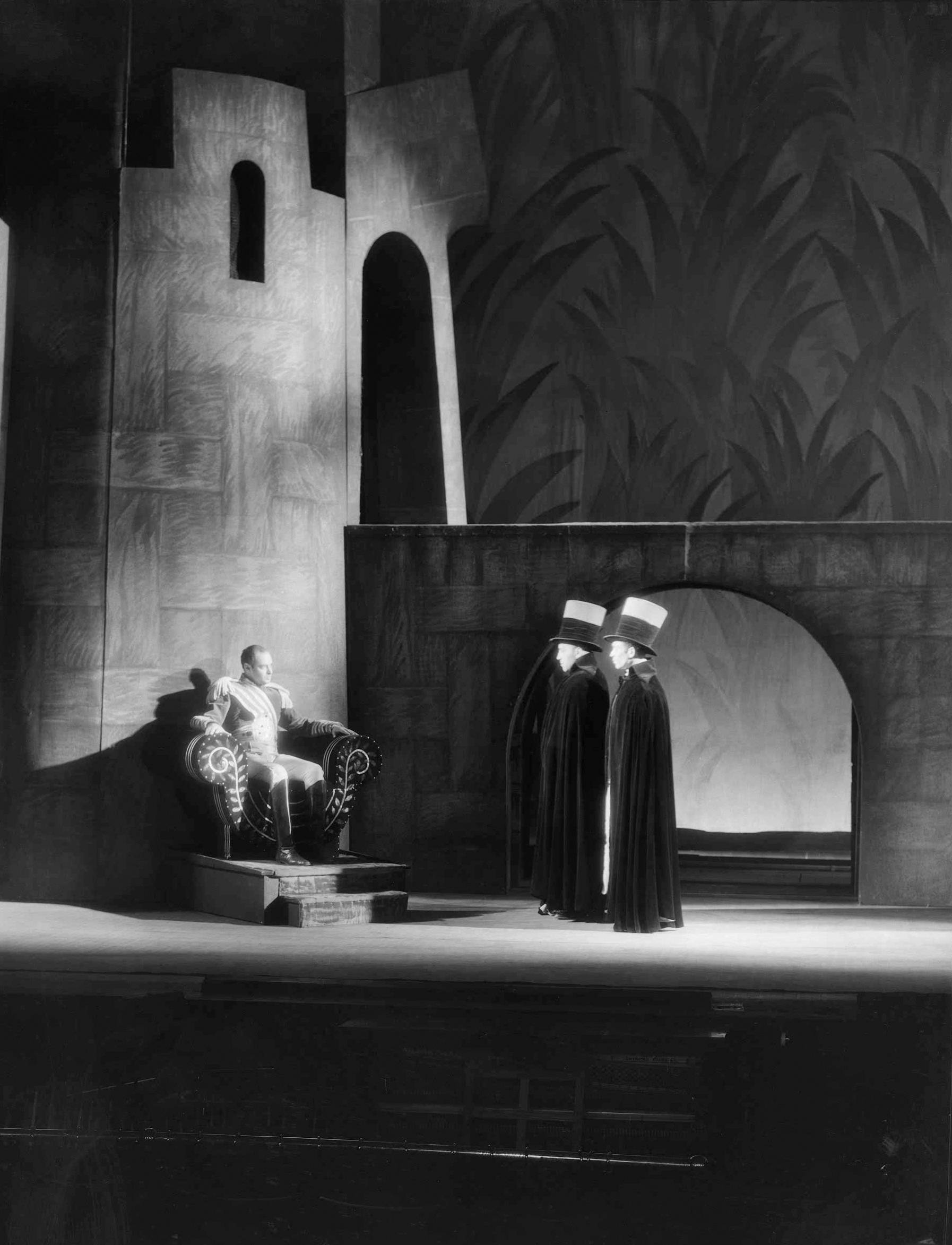
Macbeth recruiting the first two murderers, in a 1936 Harlem production of the play

The first two murderers are recruited by Macbeth in 3.1. In 3.3, the Three Murderers meet in a park outside of the palace, and the first two do not know the Third:

First Murderer. But who did bid thee join with us?
Third Murderer. Macbeth.
Second Murderer. He needs not our mistrust, since he delivers
Our offices and what we have to do
To the direction just.

The Third Murderer knows Banquo typically walks from the palace gate at this time. After the murder of Banquo, the Third Murderer asks "Who did strike out the light?" and concludes Fleance has escaped: "There's but one down; the son is fled". Altogether, the Third Murderer has six lines, almost all very brief, with the only long one showing "a suspicious familiarity with Banquo's habits".

== Analysis ==
Much of the discussion of the Third Murderer has centred on the character's identity, although the character may only be an extra. In 1929, Professor Theodore Halbert Wilson said that the question of the character's identity always provoked interested debate among his students.

In 1869, author Allan Park Paton argued that Macbeth was the Third Murderer. The killings of Banquo and Fleance were important to Macbeth and, while the banquet that night was scheduled to start at 7pm, Macbeth did not appear until midnight. Paton believes the Third Murderer extinguished a light to avoid recognition, and later, Macbeth tells Banquo's ghost something that sounds like "In yon black struggle you could never know me". (The line is actually "Thou canst not say I did it. Never shake thy gory locks at me").

Paton's theories attracted attention, with Erato Hills of the University of Cambridge calling it "very ingenious", but not supported by the play. Hills interpreted the play as portraying Macbeth, Lady Macbeth and all guests as arriving at the banquet at the same time, rather than Macbeth being late, and the mention of 7pm can be attributed to Shakespeare's lack of attention to detail. Hills also believed the First Murderer was the one who extinguished the light. John Addis complimented Paton for the "quite original suggestion", citing the belief Macbeth sent the Third Murderer out of "superabundant caution", and acknowledging Macbeth could have sent himself owing to that caution. Addis instead connected the Third Murderer to the spy mentioned by Macbeth in 3.1. Scholar Henry Norman Hudson attempted to refute speculation that Macbeth was the Third Murderer. George Walton Williams felt the law of reentry disproved the theory as this would require Macbeth to violate the law twice.

The scene in which the First Murderer describes the killing of Banquo to Macbeth has been used for and against arguments of Macbeth's identity as the Third Murderer. Macbeth appears surprised Fleance has escaped, though the surprise may be feigned.

Suggestions that the Third Murderer was the Thane of Ross were dismissed by Bertha D. Vives in 1933 for lack of evidence. Another proposed solution is that the character is a non-human personification of a concept such as Destiny.

== Portrayals ==
James Thurber published a humorous story "The Macbeth Murder Mystery" in The New Yorker in 1937, in which the narrator attempts to solve a whodunit claim that Macduff was the Third Murderer. In Marvin Kaye's 1976 book Bullets for Macbeth, a stage director dies without telling anyone which character is the Third Murderer in his production, and detectives attempt to solve the mystery.

In Roman Polanski's 1971 film version of Macbeth, the Third Murderer is Ross, played by John Stride. The added importance the film gives to Ross did not appear in the first draft of the screenplay, which instead invented a new character called the Bodyguard, who also serves as the Third Murderer. The Bodyguard was merged into Shakespeare's Ross.

Jack Gold's 1983 television version in BBC Television Shakespeare portrays Macbeth's servant Seyton, played by Eamon Boland, as the Third Murderer. In the television film, Seyton kills the other two murderers after the killing of Banquo, and then leads the murder of Lady Macduff, and is thus seen as "thoroughly vicious".

In Joel Coen's 2021 film The Tragedy of Macbeth, as in the 1971 film, the role of Ross is expanded and merged with the Third Murderer.
