= Comedy of intrigue =

Genre of comedy

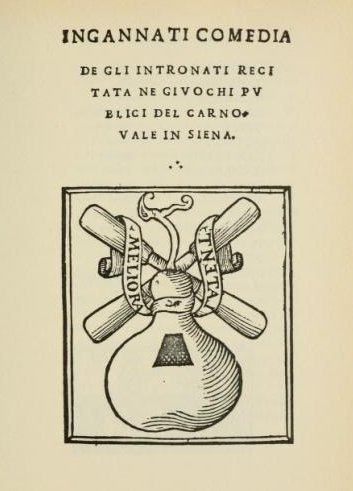
Cover to the Italian comedy of intrigue, The Deceived Ones (Italian: Gl'ingannati, 1531).

The comedy of intrigue (French: comédie d'intrigue), also known as the comedy of situation(s), is a genre of comedy in which dramatic action is prioritised over the development of character, complicated strategems and conspiracies drive the plot, and farcical humour and contrived or ridiculous dramatic situations are often employed. Characterisation tends to be defined only vaguely and the plot gives the illusion of dynamic, constant movement. The German philosopher Hegel argued that characters pursue their aims in such comedies via the use of deception. The genre was first developed in the theatre of classical Rome by Plautus and Terence. Examples of comedies of intrigue include Niccolò Machiavelli's The Mandrake (1524), the anonymous Italian play The Deceived Ones (1531), Shakespeare's The Merchant of Venice (c. 1596) and "Much Ado About Nothing", Thomas Heywood's The Wise Woman of Hoxton (c. 1604), Molière's Scapin the Schemer (1671), and the plays of Aphra Behn and Thomas D'Urfey.

== Sources ==
- Cohn, Ruby. 1998. "Comedy" In The Cambridge Guide to Theatre. Ed. Martin Banham. Cambridge: Cambridge University Press. ISBN 0-521-43437-8. 234–235.
- Hochman, Stanley, ed. 1984. McGraw-Hill Encyclopedia of World Drama: An International Reference Work in 5 Volumes. Vol. 1. 2nd ed. VNR AG. ISBN 978-0-07-079169-5.
- Law, Jonathan, ed. 2011. The Methuen Drama Dictionary of the Theatre. London: Bloomsbury. ISBN 978-1-4081-3148-0.
- Merriam-Webster. 1995. Merriam-Webster's Encyclopedia of Literature. Springfield, MA: Merriam-Webster. ISBN 978-0-87779-042-6.
- Paolucci, Anne. 1978. "Hegel's Theory of Comedy." In Comedy: New Perspectives. Ed. Maurice Charney. New York: New York Literary Forum. ISBN 0-931196-00-0. 89–108.
- Pavis, Patrice. 1998. Dictionary of the Theatre: Terms, Concepts, and Analysis. Trans. Christine Shantz. Toronto and Buffalo: U of Toronto P. ISBN 0-8020-8163-0.
