= Christopher Sly =

Character in The Taming of the Shrew

- The Taming of the Shrew character
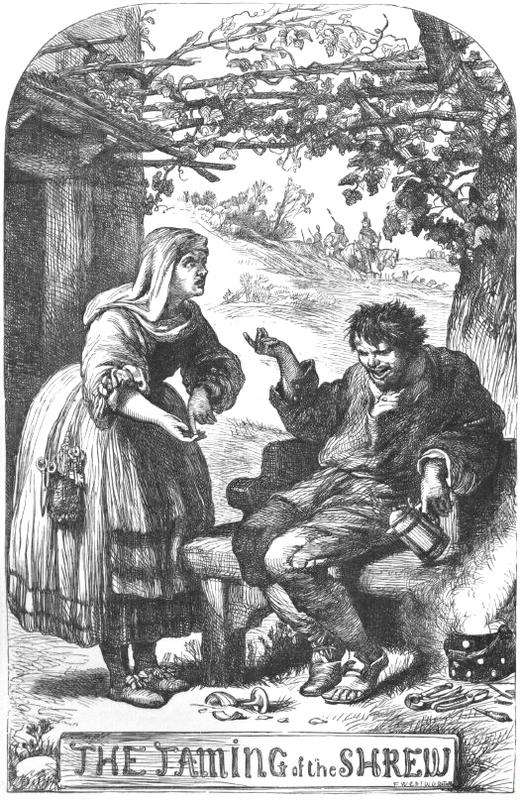
- The Hostess demands payment from Sly, illustration by H.C. Selous from The Plays of William Shakespeare: The Comedies, edited by Charles Cowden Clarke and Mary Cowden Clarke (1830)
- Created by: William Shakespeare

Christopher Sly is a minor character in William Shakespeare's The Taming of the Shrew. He is a drunk man who is easily dominated by women, set up as a foil to Petruchio, the central male character in the play.

== Role ==
The Taming of the Shrew is a play within a play. The frame play, where the action opens (called the "Induction," just prior to Act One), shows a drunk Christopher Sly being ejected from a bar by its hostess. A wealthy lord arrives, finds Sly in a drunken stupor, and decides to play a prank on him. With Sly asleep in his intoxication, the lord's men dress Sly in fine apparel and the men in turn dress up as servants and one even as Sly's wife, in an effort to persuade Sly when he wakes up that he is an aristocrat. After this task is accomplished, the lord's men perform what we know as The Taming of the Shrew. He briefly is seen again making a comment about having some privacy with his "wife" (actually a pageboy in drag).

In the standard version of the play the audience never sees or hears from Christopher Sly again and thus assume that he has probably fallen asleep. Another version has a closing segment in which Sly, deposited back outside the tavern in a stupor once more, says he will return home to deal with his own shrewish wife, having had "the best dream that ever I had in my life" in which he learned how to "tame a shrew". The closing part of the frame-play does not appear in the text of The Taming of the Shrew as it was published in the First Folio. It only appears in the version published in quarto as The Taming of a Shrew (rather than "the" Shrew).

== Warwickshire connection ==
Sly says he is from Burton Heath, where Shakespeare's aunt and uncle lived. He also mentions a "Marian Hacket, the fat alewife of Wincot". Wincot is where Shakespeare's mother was born. Both these villages are near Stratford-upon-Avon, Warwickshire, where Shakespeare grew up. Marian Hacket is said to be the landlady of an ale house, who allows Sly to build up an unpaid tab of 14 pence, but ejects him when he fails to pay up (presumably the same person as the "hostess" who appears at the beginning of the play). Reference is also made to a barmaid called Cicily Hacket, probably Marian's daughter. A Hacket family lived in Wincot at this time, but it is not known whether Marian and Cicily Hacket were real innkeepers.

Sly lists his past occupations, insisting that he was born a peddler, trained as a cardmaker, but worked as a "bearherd", (meaning a keeper of bears used in bear-baiting entertainments) before becoming a tinker.

== Appearances in other works ==
Christopher Sly is mentioned in the novel The Eyre Affair, by Jasper Fforde. A man named Victor Analogy explains that the reason why Christopher Sly does not appear after Act One of The Taming of the Shrew is because the character of Sly was, in fact, summoned out of the original copy of the play and thus was removed from the play's plot. Victor Analogy explains, "Six years ago an uneducated drunk who spoke only Elizabethan English was found wandering in a confused state just outside Warwick. He said that his name was Christopher Sly, demanded a drink and was very keen to see how the play turned out."
