= Cockpit Theatre =

17th-century theatre in London, England

Coordinates: 51°30′51″N 0°07′15″W

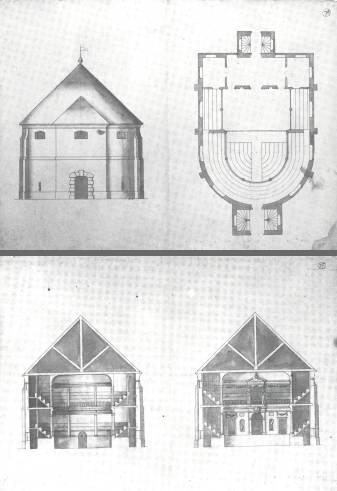
These plans, originally thought to be drawn by Inigo Jones, but now attributed to his protege John Webb, may be for the Cockpit Theatre. The drawings were originally believed to be the Blackfriars theatre.

The Cockpit was a theatre in London, operating from 1616 to around 1665. It was the first theatre to be located near Drury Lane. After damage in 1617, it was named The Phoenix.

== History ==
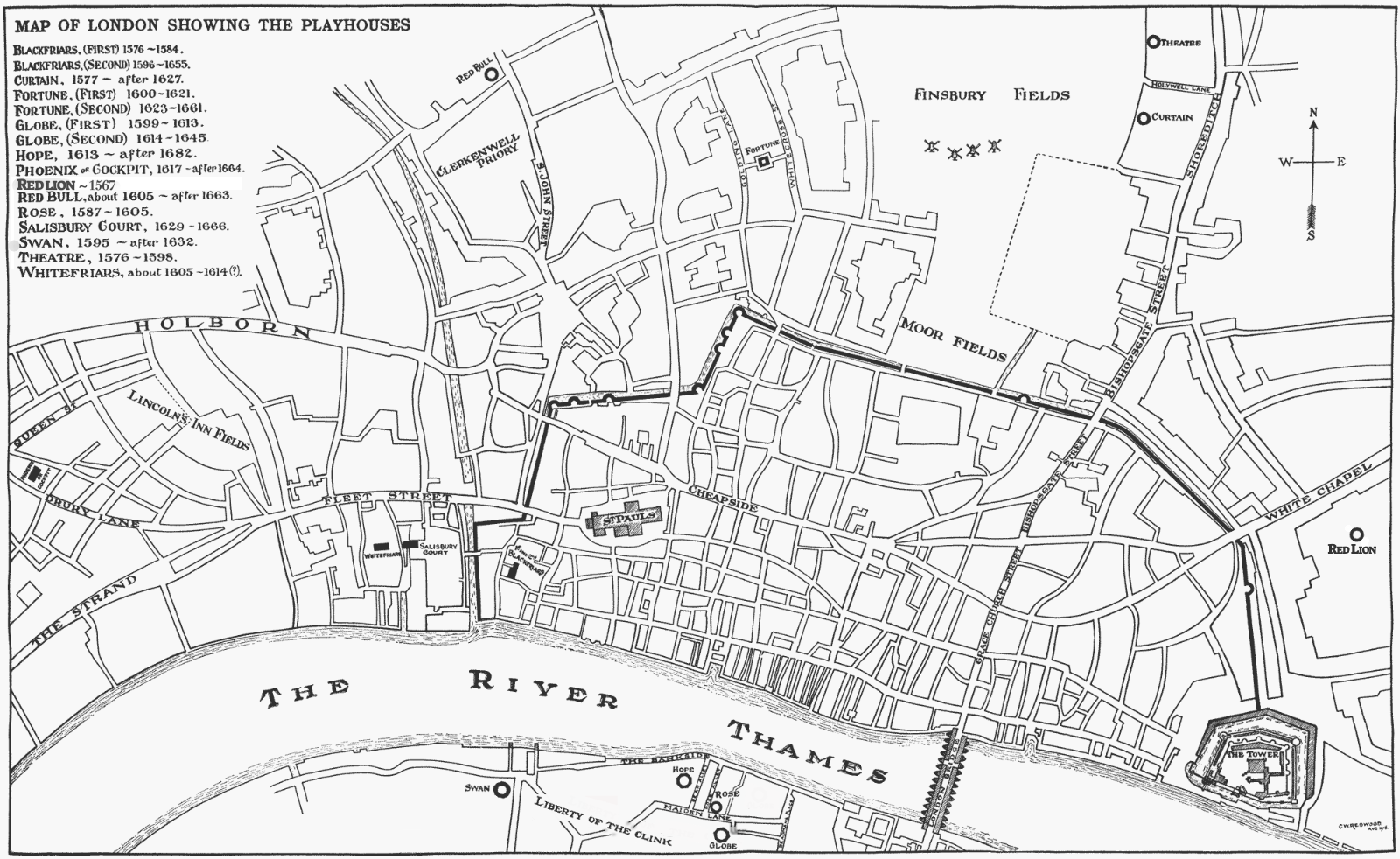
The Cockpit Theatre is north of Drury Lane, at the far left

The original building was an actual cockpit; that is, a staging area for cockfights. Most likely a round building with a peaked roof, about 40 feet (12 m) in diameter, it was erected under Henry VIII, c. 1530-32, as part of a gaming complex. Records indicate a major restoration in 1581-82 and renovations in 1589-90, 1602-3, and 1608-9 (the latter under the supervision of John Best, "cockmaster" to Henry Frederick, Prince of Wales, King James I's eldest son and heir).

In August 1616, Christopher Beeston acquired the lease to the building and converted it to an indoor playhouse. In March 1617, rioting apprentices attempted to destroy the playhouse, probably out of anger that their favorite plays had been removed from the Red Bull outdoor amphitheater, which charged only one penny for admission, to this more expensive (six-penny) venue. The actors shot at the rioters, killing three. The apprentices entered the building and cut up the costumes.

Beeston's rapid restoration of the playhouse after the riot may explain why it was sometimes called the Phoenix. Like earlier theatres, such as The Theatre in Shoreditch and The Globe in Southwark, the location was just outside the jurisdiction of the City of London. Beeston expanded the original small building; the construction work prompted complaints by neighbors, which left traces in the legal records of the time. The resulting theatre was, by one estimate, 52 feet (16 m) by 37 feet (11 m), "noticeably smaller than the Blackfriars."

The architect commissioned for the renovation is not known for a certainty, but circumstantial evidence points to Inigo Jones. Two sheets drawn by Jones and showing the interior and exterior design of some theatre have survived; John Orrell makes the case that the theatre is the Cockpit, while allowing that he cannot produce conclusive evidence to that end. (In 1629, Inigo Jones would design another "Cockpit" theatre, a private one within Whitehall called the Cockpit-in-Court or Royal Cockpit.)

Beeston intended the Cockpit to serve as an indoor complement to the Red Bull, the outdoor theatre then home to his acting troupe, Queen Anne's Men. A winter venue was needed to compete with the Blackfriars Theatre in the possession of their rival troupe, the King's Men. After a rocky start, the company proved successful in their new locale. Wickham attributes the success more to the theatre's location and comfort and to the flair of its manager, Beeston, than to the quality of its performers.

Beeston would oversee several different troupes in the Cockpit before his death in 1639. Queen Anne's Men were there from 1617 to 1619; when that company dissolved upon the death of Anne of Denmark in 1619, their place was taken by Prince Charles's Men from 1619 to 1622. Lady Elizabeth's Men were there from 1622 to 1624, and perhaps for sporadic periods as early as 1619 (the two companies, Prince Charles's and Lady Elizabeth's, had combined for a time ca. 1615). Queen Henrietta's Men had a long run at the Cockpit, from 1625 to 1636. The last troupe to occupy the Cockpit in Beeston's lifetime was one of his own creation, the King and Queen's Young Company, colloquially known as Beeston's Boys — the last assembly of boy actors in the period. They would continue in the theatre under the management of his son William.

William Beeston was forced out of the theatre when his choice of plays met with the disapproval of the Court. He was replaced by William Davenant in 1639. All theatres were closed by Parliament in 1642, under the Commonwealth. The Cockpit was used as a schoolroom, but plays continued to be shown illegally. It was raided by Puritan soldiers during a performance in 1649 and the players were imprisoned. In 1651 William Beeston paid £200 for repairs to the theatre, in the hope that he would be able to start performances there again — though the hope proved illusory. In the last years of the English Interregnum, under the common conceit that music was not acting, Davenant was permitted to present two licensed operas in the Cockpit: The Cruelty of the Spaniards in Peru in 1658 and Sir Francis Drake in 1659.

The theatres were permitted to reopen after the English Restoration in 1660, when Charles II granted Letters Patent to two companies to perform "legitimate drama" in London: the Duke's Company, led by Davenant, and the King's Company, led by Thomas Killigrew. Both companies briefly made use of the earlier generation of theatres including the Cockpit and the Salisbury Court Theatre, but quickly moved to newer and more fashionable venues — Davenant in 1661 to a theatre in Lincoln's Inn Fields that was once Lisle's Tennis Court, and Killigrew in 1660 to Gibbon's Tennis Court in Vere Street. The Cockpit was also used in this era by the companies of John Rhodes and George Jolly. Samuel Pepys wrote in his diary of several visits to the theatre between 1660 and 1663.

In 1663, Killigrew's King's Company opened the Theatre Royal, Drury Lane nearby. The Cockpit was unable to compete with this relatively grand new theatre and was further hamstrung since it was shut out of the monopoly on "legitimate drama" granted to the two patent companies. There is no record of any play being mounted at the Cockpit after 1665; the eventual fate of the structure is unknown.

The Phoenix was located in the middle of the area bounded today by Drury Lane, Great Queen Street, Great Wild Street, and Kemble Street. The entrance to the theatre was in Cockpit Alley, which ran from Drury Lane to Great Wild Street; the present-day Martlett Court is off Drury Lane roughly opposite where the entrance to Cockpit Alley was.

== See also ==
- List of English Renaissance theatres

== See also ==
- A Maidenhead Well Lost
