= Your Five Gallants =

Jacobean comedy by Thomas Middleton

Your Five Gallants is a Jacobean comedy by Thomas Middleton. It falls into the subgenre of city comedy. Allusions in the play point to a date of authorship of 1607.

The play was entered into the Stationers' Register on 22 March 1608. The quarto published by bookseller Richard Bonian is undated, but probably followed the registration by a small gap and appeared later in 1608. The title page states that the drama was acted by the Children of the Chapel, and assigns the authorship to "T. Middleton."

The five "gallants" of the play's title are frauds, poseurs, and con men—a pickpocket, pimp, pawnbroker, cheat, and whoremonger—who compete with the protagonist, Fitzgrave, for the affections of Katherine, a wealthy orphan. (The five conspire to woo Katherine together; the one who wins her will help out the others.) Fitzgrave manipulates them into exposing their own crimes and vices through a masque. Fitzgrave marries Katherine, while the "gallants" marry the five prostitutes who are their shadows in the play. Between the two groups of ne'er-do-wells, Middleton provides a vigorous satire on the manners and mores of London society of the day.

== Synopsis ==
A customer enters Frip's pawnshop and attempts to pawn the lower half of a gentlewoman's gown. Frip rejects the pawn because he is afraid the garment might be infected with the plague. Another customer ("Second Fellow") enters and—after a bit of shrewd haggling on Frip's part—pawns a gentlewoman's suit.

Primero (the pimp) enters. Frip asks Primero to teach him the secret of a card trick called "the twitch". Primero says he will divulge the secret of the trick if Frip will agree to supply clothing for "The Novice", a "courtesan" (prostitute) who has recently entered his brothel. Frip gives Primero the gentlewoman's suit he has just acquired. The Novice enters. Frip tells her that she is going to have to learn how to cheat and steal if she is going to do well in the brothel.

In an aside, Fitzgrave says that he does not trust the gallants. He says he will disguise himself as a "credulous scholar" so he can infiltrate their group and discover their true natures.

Marmaduke (Mistress Newcut's servant) tells Bungler that his cousin (Mistress Newcut) has invited him to dinner and encourages him to bring any gentleman he pleases along with him (Mistress Newcut is of course hoping that Bungler will bring Tailby to dinner). Bungler invites Goldstone to the dinner. Goldstone—attracted by the prospect of stealing whatever he can from Mistress Newcut's home—accepts the invitation. Fitzgrave/'Bowswer' enters; he asks Goldstone where his cloak is. Goldstone says that he was attacked by four men, who took the cloak from him. Fitzgrave pretends to accept this excuse; Goldstone exits. Fitzgrave makes plans to expose the five gallants.

Goldstone enters with his servant, Fulk; both of them are disguised. Goldstone tells Bungler that he is also Mistress Newcut's cousin, and that he has also been invited to her home for dinner that afternoon. They make plans to go to the dinner together.

The gallants perform their masque for Katherine. Frip gives Katherine the chain of pearl, which she recognizes. Frip is forced to admit that the chain of pearl was pawned to him.
