= A Woman Killed with Kindness =

Stage play by Thomas Heywood

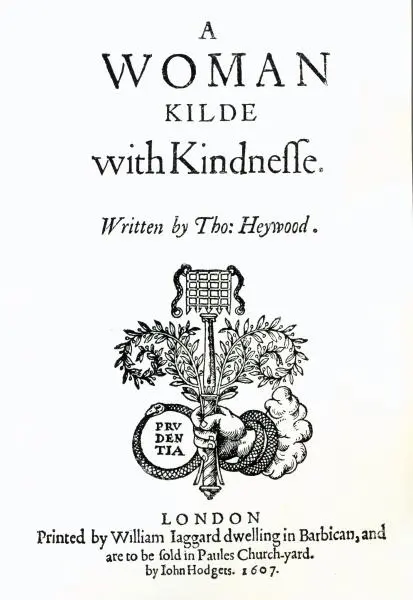
- First edition title page
- Written by: Thomas Heywood
- Original language: English
- Genre: tragedy

Premiere
- Date premiered: 1603

A Woman Killed with Kindness is an early seventeenth-century stage play, a tragedy written by Thomas Heywood. Acted in 1603 and first published in 1607, the play has generally been considered Heywood's masterpiece, and has received the most critical attention among Heywood's works. Along with the anonymous Arden of Faversham, Heywood's play has been regarded as the apex of Renaissance drama's achievement in the subgenre of bourgeois or domestic tragedy.

The play was originally performed by Worcester's Men, the company for which Heywood acted and wrote in the early Jacobean era. The records of Philip Henslowe show that Heywood was paid £6 for the play in February and March 1603. The 1607 quarto was printed by William Jaggard for the bookseller John Hodgets. A second quarto was issued in 1617 by William Jaggard's son Isaac Jaggard.

The plot of Heywood's play derives from an Italian novel by Illicini, which was translated into English and published in The Palace of Pleasure by William Painter (1566).

== Characters ==
- Master Frankford
- Mistress Anne Frankford – Frankford's wife
- Sir Francis Acton – Anne's brother
- Sir Charles Mountford
- Master Malby
- Master Wendoll – friend of Frankford
- Master Cranwell – an old gentleman
- Nicholas – a servant of Frankford
- Jenkin – a servant of Frankford
- Spigot – a butler and servant of Frankford
- Cicely Milkpail – a servant of Frankford
- Jack Slime – a country fellow
- Roger Brickbat – a country fellow
- Joan Miniver – a country wench
- Jane Trubkin – a country wench
- Isbell Motley – a country wench
- Falconer
- Susan – Charles' sister
- Sheriff
- Shafton
- Old Mountford – Charles' uncle
- Sandy – Charles' former friend
- Roder – Charles' former tenant
- Tidy – Charles' cousin
- Frankford and Anne's children

== Synopsis ==
=== Act I (Or Scenes I–III) ===
Anne and Frankford are celebrating their wedding. Anne's family remarks how well suited she is for marriage and how well she is taking to it so far. Francis and Charles arrange to go hawking and hunting tomorrow. Wendoll and Cranwell place bets on the men. The next day, Francis and Charles argue over whose falcon did better, and the quarrel devolves into a fight. Charles kills two of Francis's men. Charles immediately repents his anger. His sister Susan encourages him to flee so that he will not be arrested. He resolves to stay and face the consequences of his actions, and the sheriff comes to arrest him.

=== Act II (Or Scenes IV–VII) ===
Frankford ruminates on how lucky he is by birth and station, but mostly because he has such a lovely wife. Wendoll arrives with news of the fight between Charles and Francis. Frankford welcomes him and takes him in. The servant, Nick, does not like Wendoll, and swears he will refuse to serve him. (Scene IV)

Charles has been cleared of all charges, but it has cost him everything he has and now he is a "plain countryman". Shafton offers Charles 500 pounds in friendship—except it is not out of friendship; it is a ploy to get his remaining property, the house he shares with Susan. (Scene V)

Wendoll is in love with Anne and is trying to ignore his feelings, not least because he loves Frankford so much. He confesses his love to her anyway, and though she is horrified at first, she begins to melt. He kisses her and encourages her to take him to bed, since her husband is away. Nick witnesses the end of their exchange and swears to kill Wendoll for abusing his mistress thus. (Scene VI)

Charles and Susan are very poor, but thankful that they have a roof over their heads and each other. Shafton makes an offer on Charles's house, and when Charles refuses, has him arrested for not being able to pay back the money Shafton lent him. Francis takes joy in this, as he does not feel sufficiently revenged on Charles yet. He decides to seduce Susan to disgrace her and Charles with her lewdness, but when he sees her, he falls terribly in love with her. (Scene VII)

=== Act III (Or Scenes VIII–X) ===
Nick tells Frankford about Wendoll and Anne. At a card game after dinner where the conversation is full of doublespeak, Frankford begins to believe it and works out a plan to catch them in the act. He retires to bed early. (Scene VIII)

Susan pleads for help from various friends and family members, who all cast her off. She despairs, and Francis sends her money. She rejoices, but when she learns it is from him, she refuses it. Despairing of ever being able to woo her, Francis decides to pay Charles's debts and drop the charges against him for killing the servants earlier, in hopes that this kindness will bring Susan around. Later, Susan and Charles are shocked to find out his debts have been paid by Sir Francis. Susan surmises this must be because of his love for her, and Charles seems to think that by giving Susan to Sir Francis, he can repay all. (Scene IX–X)

=== Act IV (Or Scenes XI–XIII) ===
Frankford and Nick devise a scheme to call him away from home and see what Wendoll and Anne do in his absence. As he departs, Wendoll convinces Anne to take their dinner in her private chambers, which will no doubt lead to dessert of a carnal nature. Frankford and Nick sneak home in the night and Frankford finds Anne and Wendoll in bed together. He chases Wendoll out and expresses his disappointment in Anne. He calls for their two children and scorns her in front of them. After a bit of time, he pronounces his sentence on her: she is to take all her furniture, all her clothes and everything that belongs to her, choose which servants she likes best, and remove herself to the manor house seven miles away, where she can live out her days in peace. Moreover, she will never again be allowed to communicate with Frankford or the children in any way. (XI–XIII)

=== Act V (Or Scenes XIV–XVII) ===
Charles dresses up Susan and takes her to Sir Francis to be his bride and repay the debts. She resists, preferring death first, but relents at last. Francis is thrilled and makes preparations for their wedding at once. (XIV)

Frankford makes sure Anne left nothing behind her and finds her lute, which makes him sad. Nick sets off with it to overtake her. Cranwell departs for Sir Francis, to let him know what has happened between Frankford and his sister. Anne is sad on the road to the manor house. Nick arrives with the lute, and she tells him to swear to Frankford that he saw her sad and that she will never again eat or drink. Wendoll encounters them and hopes to comfort Anne, but she calls him the devil and flies. Charles, Susan, and Francis go to visit Anne, who is on her deathbed. They tell her Frankford has agreed to see her. He arrives, and forgives her. She dies. Frankford laments, which restores the social and patriarchal order at the end of the play. (XV-XVII)

== Self-starvation ==
Early Modern Elizabethan and Jacobean views of fasting or self-starvation were often hearkened to old Medieval views which considered a woman's fasting a visual cue to a woman's obedience, chastity, and honour. Eating, binging, or gluttony were considered to be fundamentally connected with sexuality. According to several Early Modern conduct book writers, the sin of gluttony will inevitably lead to lust, and several of these tract writers suggested female fasting should be a part of a woman's education as it would prove her to be (and help her to be) a better wife and mother.
