= The Four Prentices of London =

1592 play by Thomas Heywood

The Four Prentices of London is an Elizabethan play by English Renaissance playwright Thomas Heywood, thought to have originated c. 1592.

The play is known to have been acted by the Admiral's Men on 19 July 1594. It might also have been performed, under the title Jerusalem, by the Lord Strange's Men on 22 March and 25 April 1592.

The play was entered into the Stationers' Register on 19 June 1594, under the title Godfrey of Bouillon and the Conquest of Jerusalem, but was not published until 1615. The title page of the first quarto states that the play was acted by Queen Anne's Men at the Red Bull Theatre, though the play had a long prior history of performances by earlier companies in earlier venues, as noted above. It was printed again in 1632.

The text of the play in the 1615 volume is preceded by an Epistle to the Prentices, signed by Heywood, and a Prologue that provides yet a fourth title, True and Strange, or The Four Prentices of London.

== Synopsis ==
The old Earl of Boloigne has four sons, Godfrey, Guy, Charles, and Eustace, who are all apprentices due to his loss of his earldom by a usurper. He also has a daughter called Bella Franca, to whom he leaves what little wealth he has left. Godfrey is a mercer, Guy a goldsmith, Charles a haberdasher, and Eustace a grocer. At the beginning of the play, the father says he is to go on a pilgrimage to the Holy Land of Jerusalem to see the Saviour's sepulchre. He bids farewell to his sons and asks them to remain good apprentices.

A Captain enrolls the four apprentices in a crusade led by Robert, Duke of Normandy, King William's son. After a shipwreck, the four brothers are separated and each believes the others to be dead. Godfrey finds himself on the coasts of Spain, helps the Citizen of Boloigne fight against the Spaniards and is created Earl of Boloigne, as his father used to be. Guy is cast away in France, where he is met by the King of France and his daughter, who falls in love with him and who will follow him through the rest of the play, disguised as a page. Charles happens to land in Italy, where he kills the leader of a band of thieves and becomes their captain. Eustace, the youngest of the four, is cast away on the coast of Ireland.

Bella Franca also leaves London to go to Jerusalem. The whole company is united on their way to the Holy Land, but no one recognizes the other members of the family. The four apprentices fall in love with their sister and often fight to win her love. Tancred, the County Palatine, accompanying them, is also enamored with her. She spends her time stopping their quarrels and dismissing their overtures.

In Jerusalem, the apprentices fight against Soldan the Babylonian and Sophy the Persian and defeat them after some reversals of fortune. Finally reunited with their father and sister, they recognize each other. The news of King William the Conqueror's death leads to Robert's succession. King Robert has to crown a king of Jerusalem. Tancred and Godfrey both decline the King's offer. Guy becomes King of Jerusalem, Charles King of Cyprus and Eustace King of Sicily. Guy is united with the King of France's daughter and Tancred with the apprentices' sister Bella Franca.

Heywood's play provided the primary target of the satire in Francis Beaumont's The Knight of the Burning Pestle (1607).
