= Domestic tragedy =

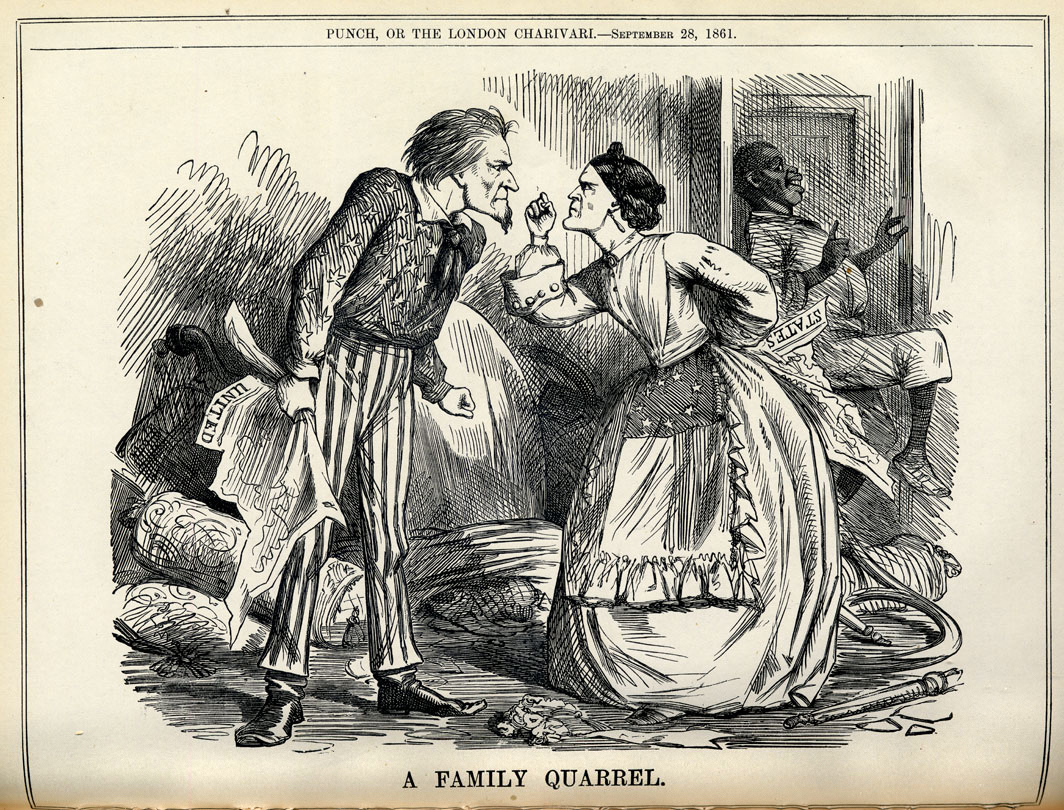

In English drama, a domestic tragedy is a tragedy in which the tragic protagonists are ordinary middle-class or working-class individuals. This subgenre contrasts with classical and Neoclassical tragedy, in which the protagonists are of kingly or aristocratic rank and their downfall is an affair of state as well as a personal matter. These plays were in particular contrast to De casibus tragedy like De casibus virorum illustrium by Giovanni Boccaccio

The Ancient Greek theorist Aristotle had argued that tragedy should concern only great individuals with great minds and souls, because their catastrophic downfall would be more emotionally powerful to the audience; only comedy should depict middle-class people. Domestic tragedy breaks with Aristotle's precepts, taking as its subjects merchants or citizens whose lives have less consequence in the wider world.

In Britain, the first domestic tragedies were written in the English Renaissance; one of the first was Arden of Faversham (1592), depicting the murder of a bourgeois man by his adulterous wife. Other famous examples are A Woman Killed with Kindness (1607), A Yorkshire Tragedy (1608), and The Witch of Edmonton (1621). Othello can be classified as a domestic tragedy.

Domestic tragedy disappeared during the era of Restoration drama, when Neoclassicism dominated the stage, but it emerged again with the work of George Lillo and Sir Richard Steele in the eighteenth century.

== See also ==
- Bourgeois tragedy
- De casibus virorum illustrium
