= Thomas Heywood =

English playwright, actor, and author (early 1570s – 1641)

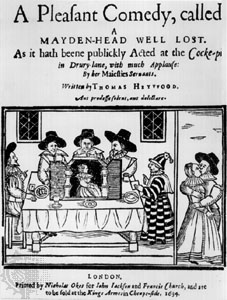
Title page from A Pleasant Comedy, Called a Maidenhead Well Lost, 1634

Thomas Heywood (early 1570s – 16 August 1641) was an English playwright, actor, and author. His main contributions were to late Elizabethan and early Jacobean theatre. He is best known for his masterpiece A Woman Killed with Kindness, a domestic tragedy, which was first performed in 1603 at the Rose Theatre by the Worcester's Men company. He was a prolific writer, claiming to have had "an entire hand or at least a maine finger in two hundred and twenty plays", although only a fraction of his work has survived.

== Early years ==
Few details of Heywood's life have been documented with certainty. Most references indicate that the county of his birth was most likely Lincolnshire, while the year has been variously given as 1570, 1573, 1574 and 1575. It has been speculated that his father was a country parson and that he was related to the half-century-earlier dramatist John Heywood, whose death year is, again, uncertain, but indicated as having occurred not earlier than 1575 and not later than 1589.

Heywood is said to have been educated at the University of Cambridge, though his college is a matter of dispute. The persistent tradition that he was a Fellow of Peterhouse was discussed and dismissed by a Master of that college. Alternatively, there is evidence that Heywood was a member of Emmanuel. Subsequently, however, he moved to London, where the first mention of his dramatic career is a note in the diary of theatre entrepreneur Philip Henslowe recording that he was paid for a play that was performed by the Admiral's Men, an acting company, in October 1596. By 1598, he was regularly engaged as a player in the company; since no wages are mentioned, he was presumably a sharer in the company, as was normal for important company members. He was later a member of other companies, including Lord Southampton's, Lord Strange's Men and Worcester's Men (who subsequently became known as Queen Anne's Men). During this time, Heywood was extremely prolific; in his preface to The English Traveller (1633) he describes himself as having had "an entire hand or at least a maine finger in two hundred and twenty plays". However, only twenty three plays and eight masques have survived that are accepted by historians as wholly or partially authored by him.

== Creative activity ==
Heywood's first play may have been The Four Prentices of London (printed 1615, but acted some fifteen years earlier). This tale of four apprentices who become knights and travel to Jerusalem may have been intended as a burlesque of the old romances, but it is more likely that it was meant seriously to attract the apprentice spectators to whom it was dedicated. Its popularity was satirized in Beaumont and Fletcher's travesty of the middle-class taste in drama, The Knight of the Burning Pestle. Heywood's two-part history plays Edward IV (printed 1600), and If You Know Not Me, You Know Nobody, or, The Troubles of Queene Elizabeth (1605 and 1606) concern, respectively, The Wars of the Roses and the life of the Queen contrasted with that of the preeminent merchant and financier Thomas Gresham.

He wrote for the stage, and (perhaps disingenuously) protested against the printing of his works, saying he had no time to revise them. Johann Ludwig Tieck called him the "model of a light and rare talent", and Charles Lamb wrote that he was a "prose Shakespeare"; Professor Ward, one of Heywood's most sympathetic editors, pointed out that Heywood had a keen eye for dramatic situations and great constructive skill, but his powers of characterization were not on a par with his stagecraft. He delighted in what he called "merry accidents", that is, in coarse, broad farce; his fancy and invention were inexhaustible.

Heywood's best known plays are his domestic tragedies and comedies (plays set among the English middle classes); his masterpiece is generally considered to be A Woman Killed with Kindness (acted 1603; printed 1607), a domestic tragedy about an adulterous wife, and a widely admired Plautine farce The English Traveller (acted approximately 1627; printed 15 July 1633), which is also known for its informative "Preface", giving Heywood an opportunity to inform the reader about his prolific creative output. His citizen comedies are noteworthy because of their physicality and energy. They provide a psycho-geography of the sights, smells, and sounds of London's wharfs, markets, shops, and streets which contrasts with the more conventional generalisations about the sites of commerce, which are satirised in city comedies.

Heywood wrote numerous prose works, mostly pamphlets about contemporary subjects, of interest now primarily to historians studying the period. His best known long essay is An Apology for Actors, a moderately-toned and reasonable reply to Puritan attacks on the stage, which contains a wealth of detailed information on the actors and acting conditions of Heywood's day. It is in the "Epistle to the Printer" in this 1612 work that Heywood writes about William Jaggard's appropriation of two of Heywood's poems for the same year's edition of The Passionate Pilgrim. In 1641 Heywood had printed The Life of Merlin Surnamed Ambrosius. The book chronicled all the kings of England dating back to the legendary king Brutus, who had come from Troy to start an exploration and a new colony, up to Charles I who was the King when Heywood died. The book goes on to chronicle certain prophesies told by Merlin and the interpretations of each and explanation of each within the context of the modern world.

== Final two decades ==
Between 1619 and 1624, Heywood seems to have inexplicably ceased all activity as an actor, but from 1624, until his death seventeen years later, his name frequently appears in contemporary accounts. In this period, Heywood was associated with Christopher Beeston's company at The Phoenix theatre, Queen Henrietta's Men or Lady Elizabeth's Men. At The Phoenix, Heywood produced new plays such as The Captives, The English Traveller, and A Maidenhead Well Lost as well as revivals of old plays. Numerous volumes of his prose and poetry were published, including two lengthy poetic works, Gynaikeion (1624), described as "nine books of various history concerning women" and, eleven years later, The Hierarchy of the Blessed Angels. As a measure of Heywood's popular standing in the final years of his life, Love's Mistress or the Queen's Masque, a play published in 1636, but performed since 1634, was reported to have been seen by King Charles I and his queen three times in eight days.

According to writings of the period, Thomas Heywood had been living in Clerkenwell since 1623 and it was there, at St. James's Church that he was buried eighteen years later. Because of the uncertainty regarding the year of his birth, his age can only be estimated, but he was likely in his late sixties, possibly having reached seventy. The date of the burial, 16 August 1641, the only documented date, also appears in a number of reference books as Heywood's death date, although he may actually have died days earlier. It may be presumed, however, that due to a possible August heatwave, the burial occurred on an expedited basis.

== Works ==
=== Plays ===
==== Tragedies ====
- A Woman Killed with Kindness (c. 1603), a domestic tragedy
- The Rape of Lucrece (1608)

==== Comedies ====
- How a Man May Choose a Good Wife from a Bad (1602)
- The Wise Woman of Hoxton (performed c. 1604; printed 1634)
- The Captives (licensed 1624)
- A Maidenhead Well Lost (performed and published 1634)
- The Late Lancashire Witches (1634), written in collaboration with Richard Brome

==== Romances ====
- The Four Prentices of London (performed c. 1592; published 1615), a romantic drama
- The Royal King and Loyal Subject (performed c. 1615–18; printed 1637)
- The Fair Maid of the West Parts One and Two (both printed 1631), a romantic drama
- A Challenge for Beauty
- The English Traveler (performed c. 1627; printed 1633)
- Fortune by Land and Sea (printed 1655), written in collaboration with William Rowley

==== Chronicle plays ====
- If You Know Not Me, You Know Nobody Parts One and Two
- Edward IV Parts One and Two
- The Golden Age (1611)
- The Silver Age (1613)
- The Brazen Age (1613)
- The Iron Age, Part One and Part Two (1632)

==== Attributed to Heywood ====
- The Fair Maid of the Exchange (printed anonymously in 1607), domestic drama doubtfully attributed to Heywood
- Dick of Devonshire
- A Cure for a Cuckold
- A New Wonder, a Woman Never Vexed
- Appius and Virginia
- Swetnam the Woman-Hater
- The Thracian Wonder

=== Masques and pageants ===
- Love's Mistress or The Queens Masque (printed 1636), the story of Cupid and Psyche as told by Apuleius
- A series of pageants, most of them devised for the City of London, or its guilds, by Heywood, printed in 1637

=== Poetry ===
- Troia Britannica, or Great Britain's Troy (1609), a poem in seventeen cantos "intermixed with many pleasant poetical tales" and "concluding with an universal chronicle from the creation until the present time"
- The Hierarchy of the Blessed Angels (1635), a didactic poem in nine books;
- Pleasant Dialogue, and Dramas Selected Out of Lucian, etc. (1637)
- The Conspiracie of Cateline [sic] and Warre of Jugurth [sic], translations of Sallust (1608).

=== Prose ===
- An Apology for Actors, Containing Three Brief Treatises (1612), edited for the Shakespeare Society in 1841
- Gynaikeion or Nine Books of Various History Concerning Women (1624)
- Englands Elizabeth: Her Life and Troubles, during Her Minoritie from the Cradle to the Crowne (1631)
- Philocothonista, or, The Drunkard, Opened, Dissected, and Anatomized (1635)
- The Life of Merlin, surnamed Ambrosius; his Prophecies and Predictions Interpreted, and their Truth Made Good by our English Annals: Being a Chronographical History of all the Kings and Memorable Passages of this Kingdom, from Brute to the reign of King Charles (1641)
