= Horatia Nelson =

Daughter of Horatio Nelson (1801–1881)

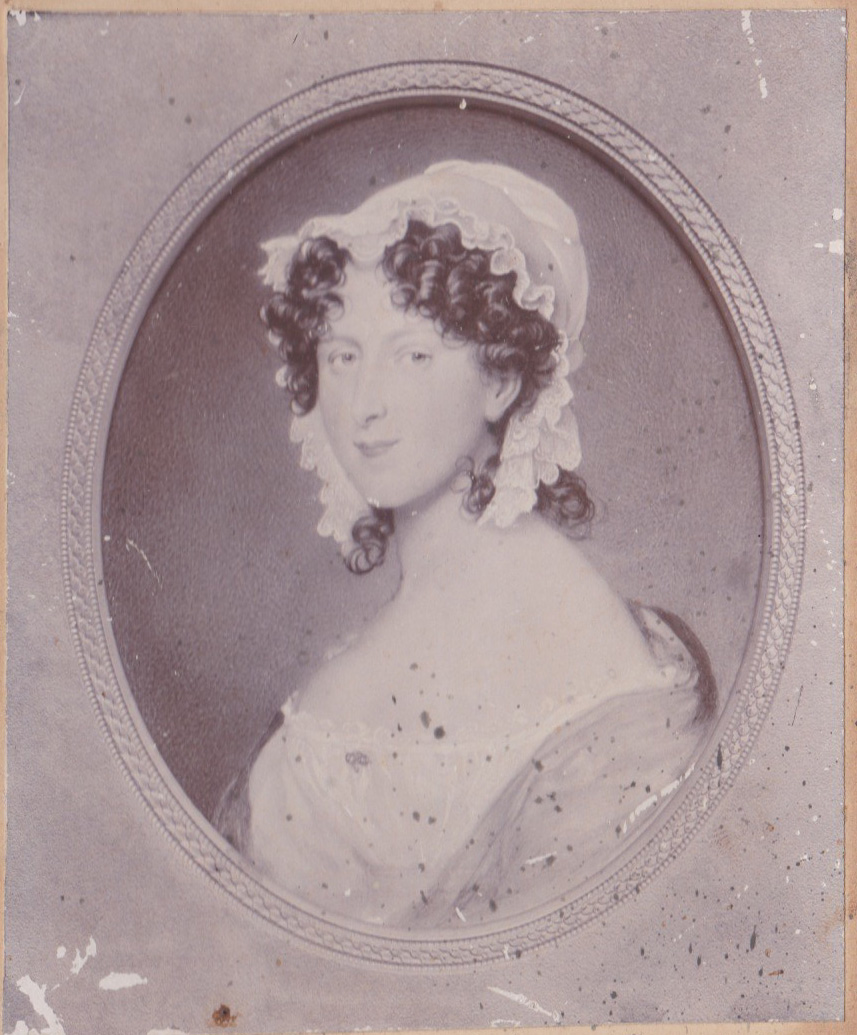
An antique photograph of a portrait of Horatia Ward (née Nelson) from the Style/Ward Family collection

Horatia Nelson, christened as Horatia Nelson Thompson (29 January 1801 – 6 March 1881), was the illegitimate daughter of Emma, Lady Hamilton, and Horatio Nelson, 1st Viscount Nelson.

== Life ==
=== Early years ===
Born in a house rented by Sir William Hamilton (Emma's husband) at 23 Piccadilly in London, as Nelson was at anchor in Torbay preparing to sail to the Battle of Copenhagen (news reached him before he set sail), she was given to a wet nurse called Mrs. Gibson, who was informed that the child, about a week old, was born six weeks earlier, at a time when Emma was in Vienna. Once Emma's husband had died on 6 April 1803, and 5 days before Nelson had to board HMS Victory on 18 May that year, Horatia was christened, aged two, at St Marylebone Parish Church as Horatia Nelson Thompson, with Emma and Horatio as the 'godparents' and a cover-story naming her as the daughter of Vice-Admiral Charles Thompson of Portsmouth Dockyard (with his agreement).

Her date of birth on the baptismal record was given as 29 October 1801 according to the record transcripts, but Kate Williams cites the year as 1800 (referring to a letter from Mrs Gibson to Emma), to further the pretence that the child had been born an orphan in Naples. A letter from Nelson to Lady Hamilton dated July 1801 was discovered in 2021 at the National Maritime Museum. In it, Nelson recommends that the baby, then 6 months old, be vaccinated with Edward Jenner's new vaccine against smallpox. Later on, her natural parents adopted her as an orphan.

Nelson was delighted at Horatia's birth (the more so when his second child with Emma, another girl, died a few weeks after her birth in early 1803), and he spent as often as he could during his brief times onshore from 1803 to 1805 enjoying domestic life with her and Emma at Merton Place, more frequently and easily once Sir William was dead.

As the Battle of Trafalgar approached, Nelson wrote a letter to Horatia with his parental blessing:

Victory, October 19, 1805.

My dearest Angel, I was made happy by the pleasure of receiving your letter of September 19, and I rejoice to hear that you are so very good a girl, and love my dear Lady Hamilton, who most dearly loves you. Give her a kiss for me. The Combined Fleets of the Enemy are now reported to be coming out of Cadiz; and therefore I answer your letter, my dearest Horatia, to mark to you that you are ever uppermost in my thoughts. I shall be sure of your prayers for my safety, conquest, and speedy return to dear Merton, and our dearest good Lady Hamilton. Be a good girl, mind what Miss Connor says to you. Receive, my dearest Horatia, the affectionate parental blessing of your Father,

NELSON AND BRONTE.

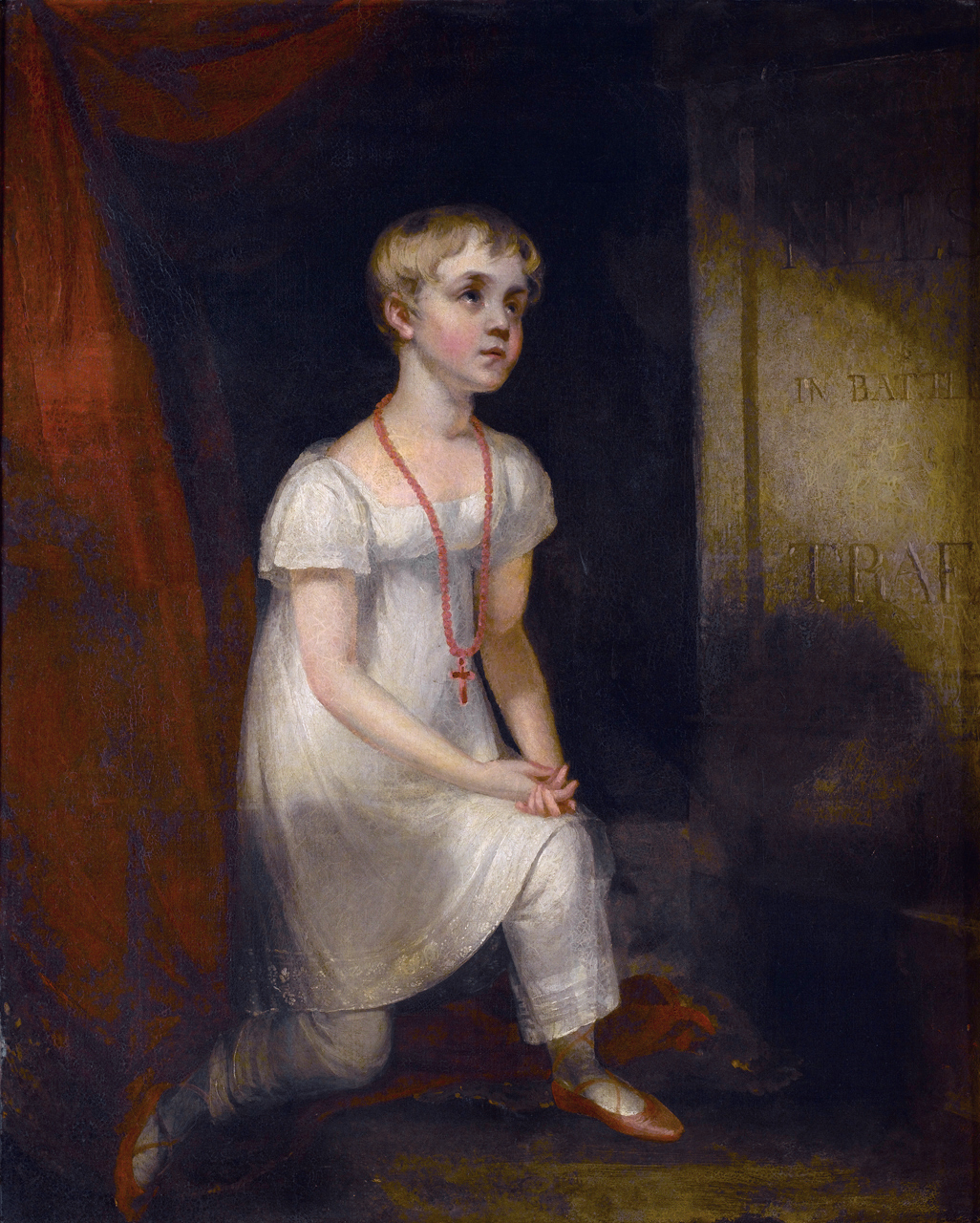
Horatia Nelson kneeling before her father's (imaginary) tomb, by William Owen (after 1807)

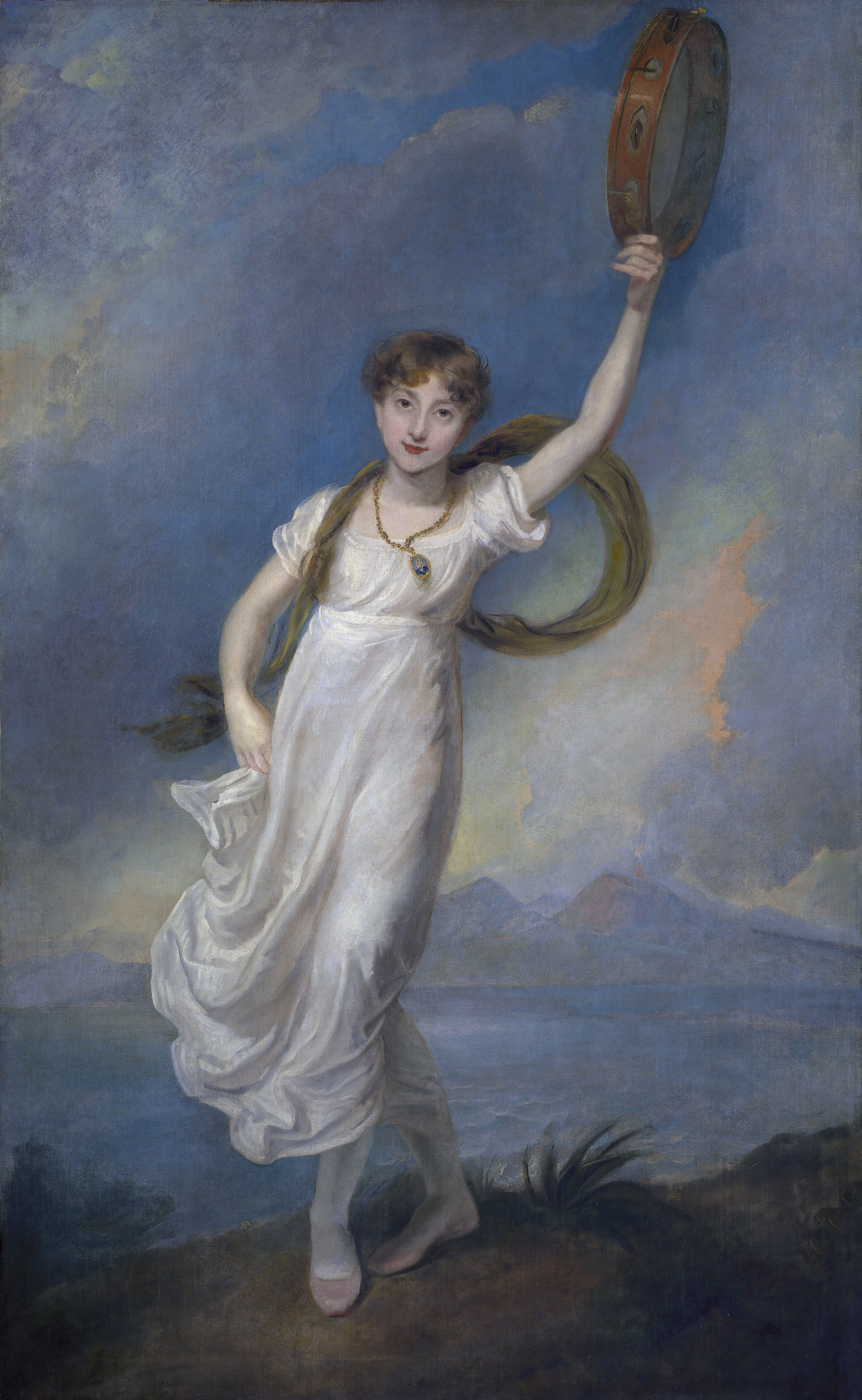
Horatia Nelson, circa 1815

In his letter to Emma the same day, he wrote "I will take care that my name shall ever be most dear to you and Horatia, both of whom I love as much as my own life." One of Nelson's last wishes was that Horatia should take the name Nelson, leaving her £200 a year in his will and adding :

"I leave to the beneficence of my country my adopted (sic) daughter Horatia Nelson Thompson, and I desire she will use in future the name of Nelson only."

Though Horatia soon learnt of her real father, she never publicly acknowledged that Emma was her mother, perhaps partly due to Emma's continued insistence after Nelson's death that she was not her mother but her guardian. Before debt set in after Nelson's death, Emma introduced Horatia to high society. Emma died just before Horatia's fourteenth birthday at Calais in January 1815, having fled there with Horatia to escape debt. Returning to Dover, she was met by one of Nelson's brothers-in-law, George Matcham, and thereafter spent two years with the Matchams, helping to look after the younger children. She then lived with another brother-in-law, Thomas Bolton, as his housekeeper, after Nelson's sister Susanna Bolton died, until he married.

Biographers describing her in her youth saw her as being tall, intelligent, able to speak her mind and surprisingly well-read. She was good at languages (Emma had taught her Italian, French and German and she also managed Spanish), music and needlework, had a lively temperament and was an animal-lover.

=== Marriage and children ===
On 19 February 1822, she married the Rev. Philip Ward (1795–1859) at Burnham Westgate Church, near her father's home village in north Norfolk, where Ward was curate. Horatia's grandfather had also been a clergyman. A third-generation Anglican clergyman, Philip was a poet and scholar, and the couple were described at their wedding as being handsome and intelligent. Horatia's biographer described the marriage as "the one certain good that befell" Horatia. Their ten children— seven boys and three girls, with the former educated by their father at home before going to university or the professions— were:

- Horatio or Horace Nelson Ward (8 December 1822 in Norfolk – 1888), christened in Norfolk on Horatia's 22nd birthday in January 1823; B.A. Trinity College, Cambridge 1847; ordained deacon 1848 and then priest in 1849 at St Mildred's parish church at Tenterden, where he acted as his father's curate until 1853. Became Rector of Radstock, Somerset, 1853–88 and died on 13 March 1888.
- Eleanor Philippa Ward (born April 1824 in Norfolk – 1872).
- Marmaduke Philip Smyth Ward (born 27 May 1825 in Norfolk – 4 Nov 1886); later became a Royal Navy surgeon, passing up an offer to play professional cricket in Borbanu, India.
- John James Stephen Ward (13 February 1827 – 1829 in Norfolk).
- Nelson Ward (born 8 May 1828 in Norfolk – 1917), articled for five years to a Tenterden solicitor, later becoming Registrar in the Court of Chancery and living in West Lodge, Pinner in Middlesex.
- Colonel William George Ward (born 8 April 1830 in Norfolk – 1878), an officer in the British Indian Army.
- Edmund Nelson Ward (10 July 1832 – 1833), died aged 6 months.
- Horatia Ward (born 24 November 1833 in Tenterden – 1890), recovered from cholera aged 13, married a solicitor from Lincoln's Inn, William Johnson (a friend and colleague of Nelson Ward's, as well as fellow cricket-lover), at Tenterden in 1858. Their descendants were still in Tenterden beyond the 1970s. Buried in Brookwood Cemetery.
- Philip Ward (May 1834 in Tenterden – 12 September 1865), served in India as a lieutenant in the 25th Bengal Native Infantry.
- Caroline Mary Ward (born January 1836 in Tenterden – 1859).

=== Struggles ===
Residence at Stanhoe in Norfolk was next granted to Philip, and it brought a better income in tithes and glebe lands, and then fairly shortly afterwards the family moved to another living at Bircham Newton. She was involved in protracted negotiations to buy Nelson's uniform coat and waistcoat (eventually bought by The Prince Consort for Greenwich Hospital in 1845, later passing from there to the National Maritime Museum). Horatia only realised she was Lord Nelson's biological daughter in 1845 after Sir Nicholas Harris published volume 3 of his intensively researched Dispatches and Letters of Vice-Admiral Nelson, which included copies of correspondence which conclusively proved that Nelson was her father She refused, however, to acknowledge that Emma, Lady Hamilton, was her mother.

Growing public interest in Nelson (Nelson's Column and Trafalgar Square were erected in 1843, for example) brought her recompense for the perceived national neglect of her immediately after Nelson's death. An appeal committee of Lord Nelson's friends and naval colleagues met frequently in London by Horatia herself, brought about a deputation to the Prime Minister and a national appeal (launched in 1850 and closed four years later; it raised only £1457).

At Horatia's insistence, the money thus raised was divided between her three sons in military service (Marmaduke, Philip and William), and so that same year (1854) Queen Victoria stepped in and allocated public funds for a £100 annual pension for each Nelson-Ward daughter.

Two of their ten children are buried with her (Edmund and her eldest daughter), though the couple do have living descendants, including Anna Horatia Tribe and her descendants, the Style Ward branch (who are also descended from Nelson's sister, Catherine Matcham, through the marriage of Horatia's son William to Catherine's granddaughter, Catherine Blanckley and the Nelson-Ward family branch. Philip died of liver disease soon after returning to England from India (he is commemorated by a plaque near the altar in St Mildred's, on the south wall), and her eldest daughter, Eleanor Philippa (while still unmarried), was knocked down by a horse bolting from an innyard – the Queen's Head in Pinner High Street, carried into a draper's shop near to where the accident occurred, and died there. Horatia was also predeceased by her husband who died suddenly on 16 January 1859 and was buried at the east of St Mildred's Tenterden with his children, Caroline Mary and Edmund Nelson (a memorial stained glass window was also put up to him in the church).

=== Later life and death ===
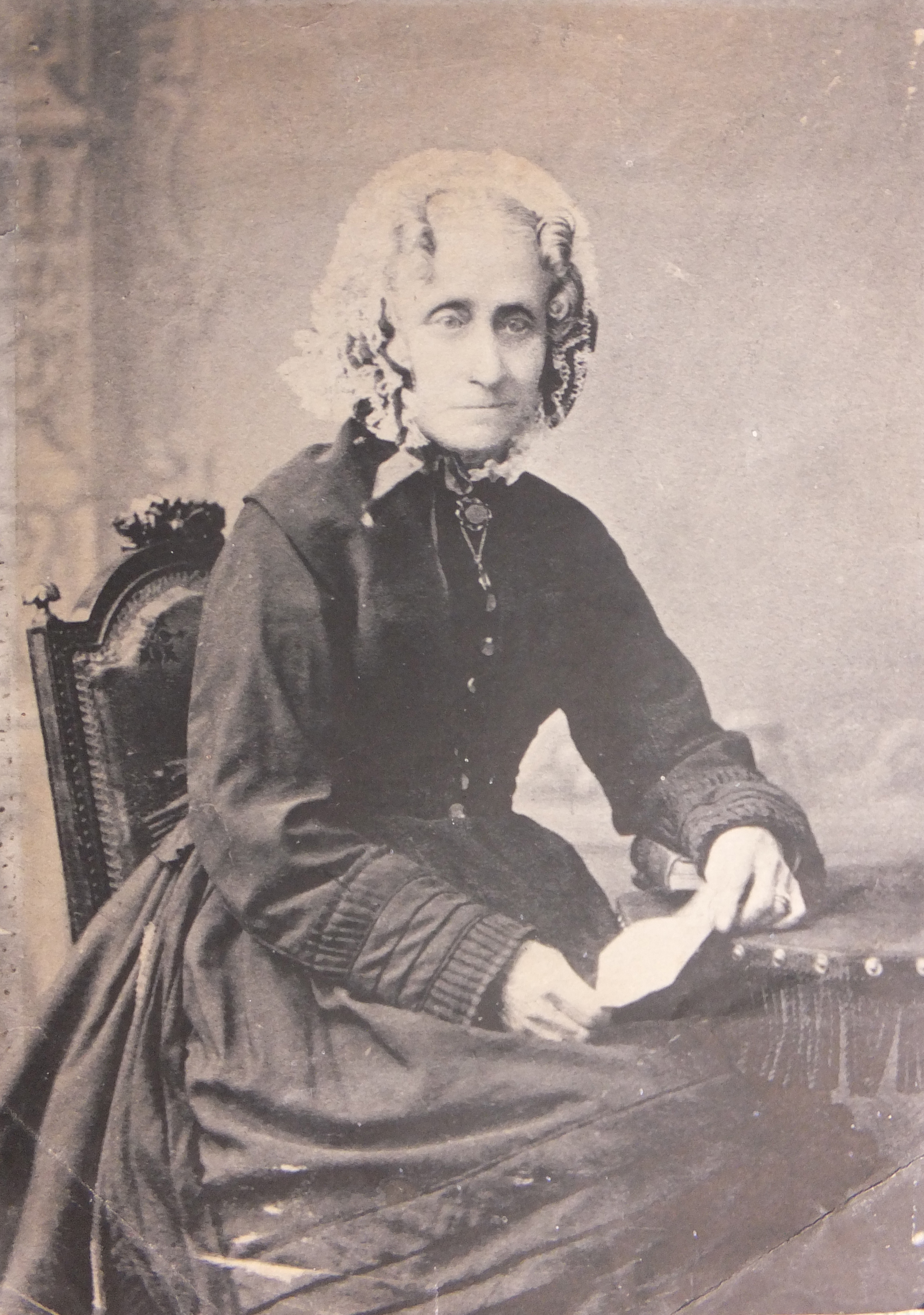
Horatia Ward in later life

After her husband's death in January 1859 she had to leave Tenterden. She moved to a house called Elmdene in Church Lane, Pinner and later at Beaufort Villas, Woodridings (a former estate in Pinner), where she died 22 years later; both were near to her son Nelson. On her death, Horatia was buried in Pinner Parish old cemetery, in Paines Lane in Pinner. Her epitaph, after mentioning her husband and children, runs:

"...Here rests Horatia Nelson Ward, who died March 6. 1881, aged 80, the beloved daughter of Vice Admiral Lord Nelson and widow of the above-named Revd. Philip Ward."

== Ancestry ==
Ancestors of Horatia Nelson

16. William Nelson (1654–1713)
8. Rev. Edmund Nelson I (1693–1747)
17. Mary Shene (1653–1732)
4. Rev. Edmund Nelson II
18. John Bland (1671–1709)
9. Mary Bland (1698–1789)
19. Thomasine Foster (1676–1745)
2. Horatio Nelson, 1st Viscount Nelson
20. Robert Suckling (1641–1706), son of Robert Suckling (1602–1690; 1st cousin of Sir John Suckling) and Anne Wodehouse (1611–1653; daughter of Sir Thomas Wodehouse, 2nd Bt.)
10. Rev. Maurice Suckling (1676–1730)
21. Sarah Shelton (1648–1695)
5. Catherine Suckling
22. Sir Charles Turner, 1st Baronet
11. Mary Anne Turner (1693–1768)
23. Mary Caroline Walpole (1673–1701), daughter of Col. Robert Walpole
1. Horatia Nelson
6. Henry Lyon
3. Emma Lyon, Lady Hamilton
14. Thomas Kidd
7. Mary Kidd
15. Sarah Hancock

== Arms adopted by her descendants (the Nelson-Wards) ==
Coat of arms of Nelson-Ward
Crest 1, A wolf's head erased Or gorged with a collar Sable thereon three bezants and charged on the neck with a trivet of the Second (Ward); 2, Upon waves of the sea the stern of a man-of-war Proper thereon inscribed 'Victory' in letters Gules (Nelson). Escutcheon Quarterly; first and fourth: Azure, a cross flory between four lions passant guardant Or (Ward); second and third: Or, a cross flory Sable a chief Gules thereon a fess engrailed of the Field charged with three bombs fired Proper (Nelson). Motto Sub cruce salus

== Portrait misattribution ==
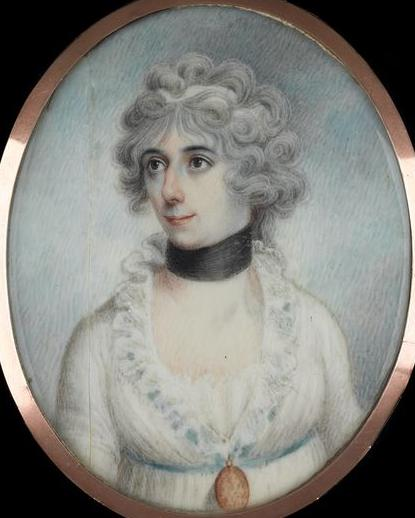
Portrait erroneously attributed as Horatia Nelson

This portrait of an unknown female owned by Royal Museums, Greenwich, was until recently believed to be of Horatia Nelson, and many websites and other publications continue to attribute it to Horatia in error. However, Royal Museums Greenwich have stated, "we no longer think the woman in white is Horatia. She has some likeness to Nelson, but Horatia did not have such a marked resemblance from other portraits of her in youth (we have a bust by Christopher Prosperi showing her as a child and an oil portrait of her in early teens). Where this identification started is not clear: the provenance of the item stops with its exhibition in 1889 when in the hands of a Bond Street dealer and the only link with the Nelson-Ward family is that they had a copy made of it, probably at that time and relying on his identification of it, not theirs. There is, so far, no evidence it was ever in Nelson-Ward family possession (or other branches of the Nelson family), which is the obvious place to have expected to find it, or at least information linking it to them – but there is none."

== Bibliography ==
- Winifred Gérin, Horatia Nelson, Clarendon, 1970
- Tom Pocock, Nelson's Women, Andre Deutsch, 1999, chapters 10 and 11
- Kate Williams, England's Mistress – The Infamous Life of Emma Hamilton, Hutchinson, London, 2006
