= Suckling (surname) =

Suckling is a surname. Notable people with the surname include:

- Catherine Suckling (1725–1767), mother of Horatio Nelson
- Charles Suckling (1920–2013), British chemist
- Edmund Suckling (1580–1628), Dean of Norwich
- Ernest Suckling (1890–1962), English cricketer
- Florence H. Suckling (1848–1932), English activist and writer
- George Suckling (18th century), British Virgin Islands lawyer
- Isabel Suckling (born 1998), British choral music recording artist
- James Suckling (born 1958), American wine critic
- John Suckling (poet) (1609–1642), English Cavalier poet
- John Suckling (politician) (1569–1627), member of the Privy Council of the United Kingdom
- Maurice Suckling (1726–1778), British Navy officer
- Matt Suckling (born 1988), Australian rules footballer
- Norman Suckling, New Zealand rower
- Norman Charles Suckling (1904–1994), English biographer, composer, pianist, and writer on music
- Perry Suckling (born 1965), English footballer
- Robert Suckling (1520–1589), English Member of Parliament
- Sue Suckling, businesswoman and commercial director from New Zealand
