= Edmund Nelson (priest) =

English Anglican priest; father of Horatio Nelson

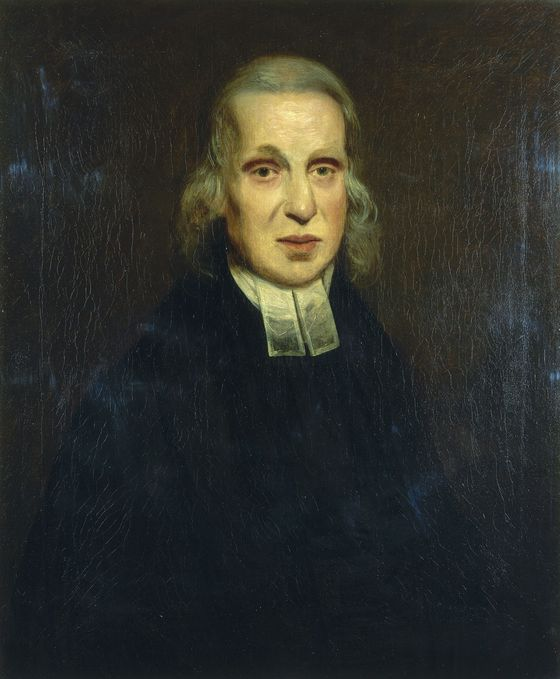
The Rev. Edmund Nelson, portrait by William Beechey, dated 1800. National Maritime Museum, Greenwich

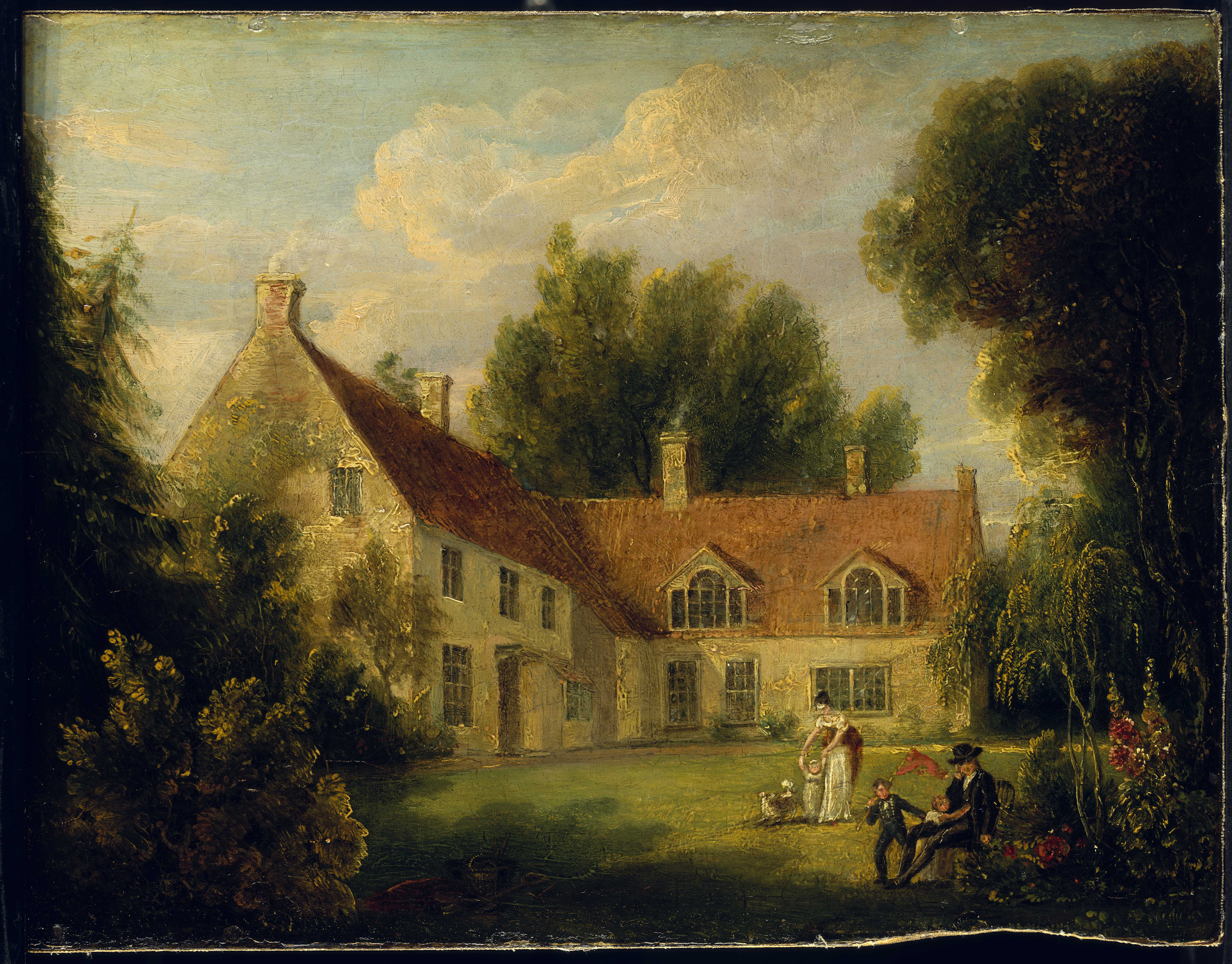
Edmund Nelson seated in the garden at Burnham Thorpe Rectory, with his young son Horatio dressed as a sailor, and other family members. Royal Museums, Greenwich

Arms of Nelson of Burnham Thorpe: Or, a cross flory sable a bendlet gules. As sculpted on the ledger stone of his wife Catherine Suckling in All Saints' Church, Burnham Thorpe. Admiral Nelson adopted a differenced version of these arms, to which were added augmentations of honour

The Reverend Edmund Nelson (19 March 1722 – 26 April 1802) was a British priest who was Rector of Burnham Thorpe in Norfolk and the father of Admiral Horatio Nelson.

== Early life and family ==
Nelson was born in Cambridge, England on 19 March 1722, one of eight children of Edmund Nelson, a priest, and Mary Bland. The Nelsons were an old Norfolk family and were moderately prosperous. Nelson was baptised on 29 March 1723 at the parish church at East Bradenham in Norfolk. Three of his siblings died in infancy, whilst Nelson himself had 'a weak and sickly constitution'. He was educated at several Norfolk schools, at Scarning, Northwold and Swaffham, before attending Gonville and Caius College, Cambridge. He attained a bachelor's degree, followed by a Master's, after which he left to become curate at his father's church in Sporle. He then worked under Thomas Page, Rector of Beccles, and on his father's death in 1747, Nelson succeeded to the livings of Hilborough and Beccles.

During his time at Beccles, Nelson met Catherine Suckling, and married her on 11 May 1749 at Beccles. Catherine was the daughter of another priest, Maurice Suckling, and her grandmother had been the sister of Robert Walpole. The family therefore became distant relations of the powerful Earls of Orford, and Catherine's immediate family, including her brother, Maurice Suckling, provided important influence that would help the Nelsons' children in their early years.

The couple moved to Swaffham after their marriage where Catherine bore Nelson three children. Two died in infancy; a third, Maurice, survived. They then moved to Sporle, where on 12 June 1755 Catherine gave birth to the couple's first daughter, Susanna. Also in 1755 Horace Walpole offered Nelson the position of rector at Burnham Thorpe. He accepted and the two settled at the rectory. William was born on 20 April 1757, and on 29 September 1758, Catherine gave birth to Horatio, naming him after Horatio's godparent, Horatio Walpole, 1st Earl of Orford. Horatio was a sickly child, and Nelson feared he would not live long enough to be baptised at the public ceremony arranged for 15 November. Horatio was baptised at a private ceremony on 9 October.

The last of the Nelson children followed, Ann on 20 September 1760, Edmund on 4 June 1762, Suckling on 5 January 1764, and Catherine on 19 March 1767. Another boy, George, was born in 1765 but died three months later. Nelson's wife, Catherine, died on 26 December 1767, leaving him with eight children. Grief-stricken, he buried her four days later in the church at Burnham Thorpe. He never remarried. Catherine's mother, Ann, died shortly afterwards. Maurice Suckling, Nelson's brother-in-law, visited the rectory to attend the funerals, and found him heart-broken, and fearing for the future for his children. He had begun to call in favours with relatives to ensure that educations and positions could be found for them, and Suckling promised to do what he could for one of the boys, using the patronage available to him as a naval captain. Nelson himself wrote

As it has fallen to my lott to take upon me the care and affectation of double parent, they [the children] will hereafter excuse where I have fallen short and the task has been too hard.

The concern that he might fail to do the best for his children remained with him all his life. He duly decided to send William and Horatio, or Horace as the boy preferred to be known at this stage in his life, to Norwich School.

Nelson eventually found suitable positions and schooling for all of his children, and when Horatio asked his father to write to Maurice Suckling and request a place for him on his ship, Nelson did so. Despite Maurice's apparent misgivings, he agreed to take Horatio into the service.

== Later life ==
As his children left the home and went off to their new lives, Nelson remained at Burnham Thorpe. He lived a modest quiet life, but continued to follow the lives and careers of his children with interest. He had a modest income provided by his work as a parson, as well as several small investments and the legacy of his daughter Ann, who had died in 1784. In 1787, Horatio returned to England after serving in the West Indies, bringing with him his new wife, Frances Nisbet, informally known as 'Fanny'. Nelson had by this time come to prefer his seclusion, and did not look forward to the arrival of his extended family. His health was never particularly strong, and he suffered from 'paralytic and asthmatic' conditions. He took occasional trips to Bath to sample the springs. He wrote

I am not now anxious to see them. Him for a day or two I should be glad of, but to introduce a stranger to an infirm and whimsical old man, who can neither eat nor drink, nor talk, nor see, is as well let alone.

Consequently, it was not until late 1788 that Horatio and his new wife arrived at the rectory at Burnham Thorpe. Horatio had spent a considerable amount of time attempting to obtain command of another ship, but finally recognised this was unlikely to occur in the near future, and bowed to Fanny's wishes to settle and start a household. Despite Nelson's initial reluctance to meet them, he found Fanny to be an enduring friend, and Horatio to be a dutiful and caring son. Nelson moved out of the rectory in 1790 to let the couple start to establish their own household. He settled in a cottage at Burnham Ulph, but made frequent visits to the couple. Nelson continued to make trips to Bath during the cold Norfolk winters, and Fanny often accompanied him while her husband was at sea. His declining health made him more and more dependent on Fanny, whilst he sought to act as her guardian while Horatio was away. The two enjoyed the pace of life at Bath, and became firm friends, with Fanny reading to him and providing companionship. Nelson wrote that

[Fanny] truly supplies a kind and watchful child over the infirmities and whimsies of age.

He soon retired, passing on the parsonage to his son, Suckling Nelson. As Horatio's fame grew, Nelson followed his son's exploits, and soon came to be accosted by well-wishers on his walks around Bath. Fanny wrote

He is grown young. These blessings in his declining days cheer him.

In 1800, with Horatio's fame continually increasing, Nelson sent Fanny to London to visit the studios of William Beechey, and to ask if Beechey might come to take a sitting. Beechey replied that he would not, as he only travelled to the sitter in the case of royalty, but when he enquired who the sitter was, and on being told it was the father of Horatio Nelson, declared 'My God! I would go to York to do it!' Nelson however remained dismayed by the breakdown of his son's marriage and wrote to Horatio on occasion to rebuke him for his neglect of Fanny. He did however visit Horatio at Merton Place, where he was living with William and Emma Hamilton.

== Death and burial ==
Nelson was in declining health by early 1802. Fanny had travelled from London to be at his side, but Horatio remained at Merton Place, writing a letter stating

I have no hopes that he can recover. God's will be done. Had my father expressed a wish to see me, unwell as I am, I should have flown to Bath, but I believe it would be too late. However, should it be otherwise and he wishes to see me, no consideration shall detain me a moment.

He died later that day, 26 April 1802, at the age of 80. His son did not attend the funeral, held at Burnham Thorpe on 11 May, but did pay the funeral expenses. Nelson was described by a later biographer of Horatio as 'kind, modest and generous... to be counted on in times of trouble.' He also possessed a dry sense of humour. For a full account of Edmund Nelson's death and funeral see 'From Bladud's Fountains to Burnham Thorpe'.

His large but simple slate ledger stone survives in All Saints' Church, Burnham Thorpe, inscribed: The grave of the Reverend Edmund Nelson Rector of this parish. Next to it is the more elaborate ledger stone of his wife Catherine Suckling, displaying the arms of Nelson (Or, a cross flory sable overall a bendlet gules) impaling Suckling, with a lengthy inscription in Latin.

== Marriage and issue ==
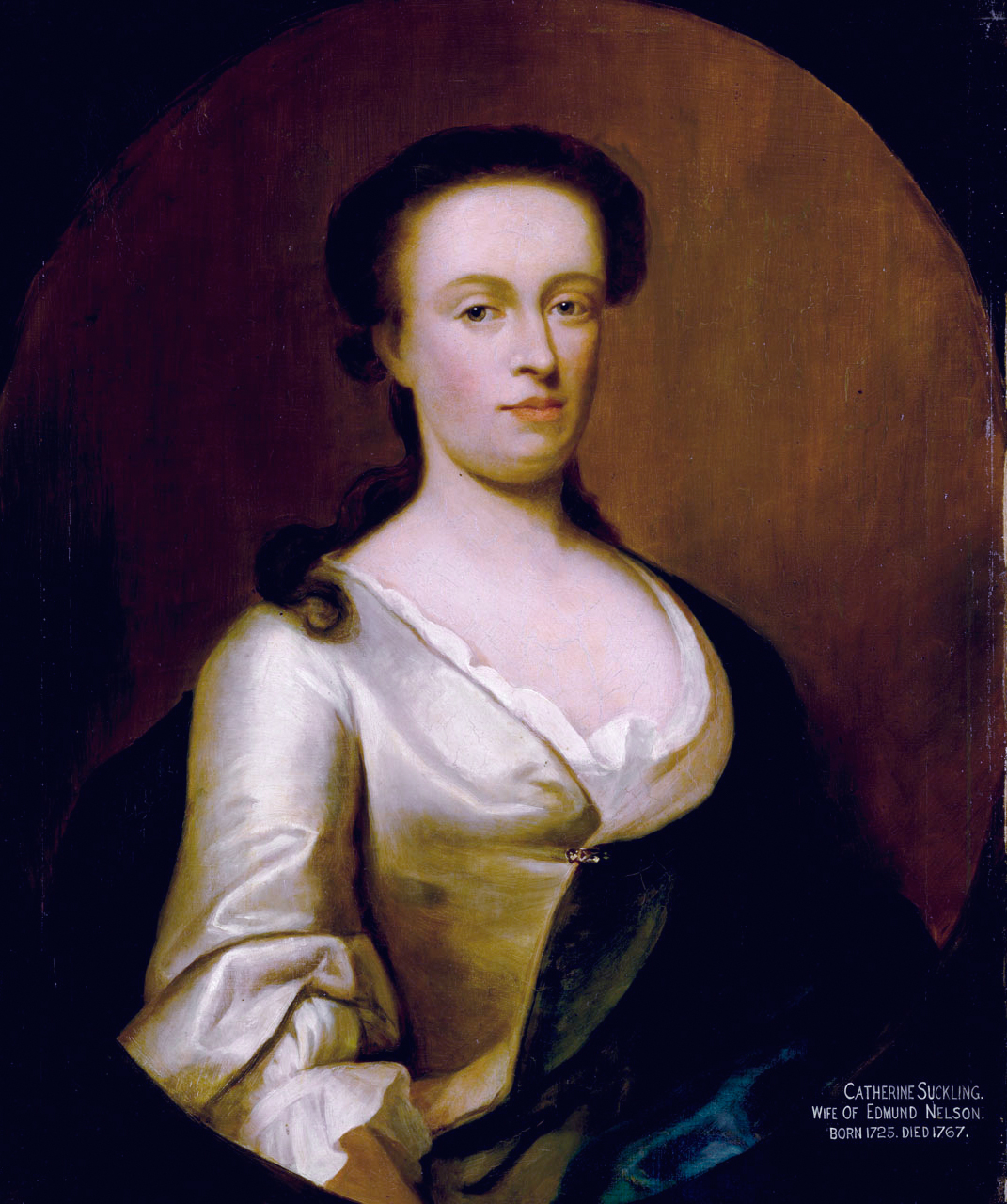
Catherine Suckling, wife of the Rev. Edmund Nelson

Arms of Suckling: Per pale gules and azure, three bucks trippant or, as sculpted on the ledger stone of Catherine Suckling in Burnham Thorpe Church

Ledger stones of the Rev. Edmund Nelson and of his wife Catherine Suckling, Burnham Thorpe Church

On 11 May 1749 at Beccles in Suffolk, the Rev. Edmund Nelson married Catherine Suckling (1725–1767), a daughter of the Rev. Maurice Shelton Suckling (d.1730), Rector of Barsham in Suffolk and a Prebendary of Westminster Abbey, a son of Robert Suckling (d.1708) of Woodton (aliter Wootton) in Norfolk and of Barsham, Sheriff of Norfolk in 1701, nephew of the poet Sir John Suckling (d.1641), MP, of Barsham, of an ancient gentry family established at Wootton in 1348. Sir John Suckling sold the manor of Barsham to his uncle, Charles Suckling of Wootton (grandfather of Robert Suckling (d.1708)), probably for the purpose of raising his regiment of horse for the King's service.

Catherine's mother was (Mary) Anne Turner (1691–1768), a daughter of Sir Charles Turner, 1st Baronet by his wife Mary Walpole (1673–1701) a sister of Robert Walpole, 1st Earl of Orford, the Prime Minister.

Catherine's ledger stone survives in Burnham Thorpe Church, inscribed in Latin as follows under an escutcheon of the arms of Nelson impaling Suckling:

Conservendae memoriae causa Catherinae Nelson Mauritii Suckling DD filiae nep(o)tis Caroli Turner Baronetti et primae eius uxoris Mariae filiae Roberti Walpole de Houghton Armig(eri), uxoris Edmundi Nelson huius ecclesiae rectoris. 11 liberos sibi peperit supersunt. Conjugali et materna affectione Christiana caritate & vera am(ore) fuit praedita. Obiit Decemb(ris) 26 Ann(o) Salutis 1767 suae aetatis 42. Let these alone, let no man move these bones ("By cause of conserving the memory of Catherine Nelson, a daughter of Maurice Suckling, Doctor of Divinity, a grand-daughter of Charles Turner, Baronet, and of his first wife Mary, a daughter of Robert Walpole of Houghton, Esquire, wife of Edmund Nelson rector of this church. She bore to him 11 children (who) are surviving. She was endowed with conjugal and maternal affection, with Christian charity and with real love. She died on 26 of December in the Year of Salvation 1767, of her age 42")

By his wife Edmund Nelson had 11 children:

=== Sons ===
- Edmund Nelson (1750-1750), 1st son, died in infancy aged 4 months;
- Horatio Nelson (1751-1751), 2nd son, died in infancy aged 4 months;
- Maurice Nelson (1753-1801), 3rd son, clerk of the Navy Office, married Syphia Smith, died without issue.< Predeceased his illustrious younger brother the Admiral.
- The Rev. William Nelson, 1st Earl Nelson "of Trafalgar and of Merton" (1757-1835), 4th son, heir to his younger Admiral brother's titles Baron Nelson "of the Nile and of Hillborough" (1801, with special remainder) and of the Sicilian title Duke of Bronte; following the Admiral's death he was created Earl Nelson (1805) and Viscount Merton (1805) and was granted by the crown the estate of Standlych House in Wiltshire, renamed in honour of his brother "Trafalgar House". He died without male issue, but left one daughter, Charlotte Nelson, as heiress to his Sicilian dukedom. His heir male to his English titles, by special remainder, and to his estate of Trafalgar House, was his nephew Thomas Bolton (1786–1835), son of his sister Susannah Nelson (1755-1813) by her husband Thomas Bolton of Wells in Norfolk. Thomas Bolton, in accordance with the terms of the inheritance, adopted the surname Nelson in lieu of Bolton, and thus became Thomas Nelson, 2nd Earl Nelson. The 1st Earl's daughter was:
  - Charlotte Mary Nelson, suo jure 3rd Duchess of Bronté (1787–1873), who married Samuel Hood, 2nd Baron Bridport (1788-1868), a younger grandson of Admiral Samuel Hood, 1st Viscount Hood (1724-1816) (elder brother of Admiral Alexander Hood, 1st Viscount Bridport, 1st Baron Bridport (1726-1814)). Charlotte's husband was the heir of the estates (including Cricket St Thomas in Somerset) of his childless great-uncle Admiral Alexander Hood, 1st Viscount Bridport, 1st Baron Bridport (1726-1814), and (due to a special remainder) of his Irish peerage Baron Bridport, but not to his English titles which expired on his death due to lack of issue. By her husband she had issue including:
    - Alexander Nelson Hood, 1st Viscount Bridport (1814-1904), 3rd Baron Bridport, 4th Duke of Bronté, created Viscount Bridport in 1868.
- Admiral Horatio Nelson (1758-1805), 5th son, the famous victor of Trafalgar and of The Nile, 1st Viscount Nelson "of the Nile and of Burnham Thorpe" (1801), 1st Baron Nelson "of the Nile and of Burnham Thorpe" (1798), 1st Baron Nelson "of the Nile and of Hillborough" (1801, with special remainder), 1st Duke of Bronte (1799, Peerage of the Kingdom of Sicily and Naples). He married Frances Woodward but died without legitimate issue, leaving his only surviving brother, the Rev. William Nelson, as heir to his Sicilian dukedom of Bronte and (by special remainder) to his English title Baron Nelson "of the Nile and of Hillborough". His other titles expired on his death, due to lack of issue.
- Edmund Nelson (1761-1789), 6th son, died aged 28, as stated on his mural monument in Burnham Thorpe Church.
- The Rev. Suckling Nelson (1764-1797), died unmarried aged 33;
- George Nelson (1765-1766), died in infancy aged 3 months

=== Daughters ===
- Susannah Nelson (1755-1813), who married Thomas Bolton (1752-1834) of Wells in Norfolk, a dealer in corn, malt and coals. Her issue included:
  - Thomas Nelson, 2nd Earl Nelson (1786–1835), heir male of his uncle, the Rev. William Nelson, 1st Earl Nelson, 2nd Duke of Bronte, (but not to his Sicilian Dukedom which descended to 1st Earl Nelson's only daughter), who following his inheritance adopted the surname Nelson in lieu of his patronymic.
- Anne Nelson (1760-1783), died unmarried, buried at Bathford, Somerset;
- Catherine Nelson (1767-1842), who married George Matcham and had numerous issue; she was buried at Slaugham in Sussex.
