= Suckling (disambiguation) =

- Suckling may refer to the process of lactation in which all mammals provide milk for their young
- Suckling may also refer to the breastfeeding of a human infant or young child

Suckling may also refer to:

- Suckling (surname)
- Mount Suckling, the highest peak of the Goropu Mountains
- The Suckling, a 1989 horror film
- ScotAirways, formerly Suckling Airways, a British airline

== See also ==
- Suckling pig
