= The Court Beggar =

Play written by Richard Brome

The Court Beggar is a Caroline era stage play written by Richard Brome. It was first performed by the acting company known as Beeston's Boys at the Cockpit Theatre. It has sometimes been identified as the seditious play, performed at the Cockpit in May 1640, which the Master of the Revels moved to have suppressed. However, the play's most recent editor, Marion O'Connor, dates it to "no earlier than the end of November 1640, and perhaps in the first months of 1641".

== Publication and performance ==
The play was first published during the Interregnum, in the 1653 Brome collection Five New Plays, issued by the stationers Humphrey Moseley, Richard Marriot, and Thomas Dring. The title page provides the incorrect date of 1632 for the play's first performance–perhaps an error, or perhaps deliberate misdirection regarding a still-controversial subject. The title page also specifies that the play was "Acted at the Cock-pit, by his Majesties Servants," that is, by The King and Queen's Young Company, colloquially known as Beeston's Boys after their founder, Christopher Beeston. Beeston's Boys did not exist until 1637.

== Satire ==
Brome's satire was directed at two primary targets, two aspects of Court affairs in the late 1630s:

1. The first was the increasingly desperate and rapacious financial manipulations employed by Charles's administration, against growing opposition in the years leading up to the English Civil War;
2. The second was the circle of favourites that clustered around Queen Henrietta Maria, especially Sir John Suckling and Sir William Davenant.

The Court Beggar also mocks King Charles for failing to deal effectively with the Scottish Presbyterians, which only added to the official ire against the play.

The play is set against the speculative financial mania of the time. Britain was then enjoying, or enduring, a vigorous, perhaps an overheated financial expansion: the success of the British East India Company and the foundation of colonies in North America fed a fad for ever-wilder projects – a craze that Brome would mock in another play from the same era, The Antipodes. (As is sometimes the case in such expansions, the rich got richer while the poor got poorer – a subject Brome would address in his A Jovial Crew of 1641.) The Court fed this speculative craze by the granting of "monopolies" to various parties, for substantial fees.

The second aspect of the satire involves Queen Henrietta's circle. Sir John Suckling is readily recognisable in The Court Beggar in the character of the mad Sir Ferdinando, who shares Suckling's passion for cribbage and his compulsive gambling and womanising. The play alludes to an incident in which Suckling accepted a beating rather than fight a duel; contemporary audiences could have had little doubt as to the target of the satire. Brome also targets Davenant as the courtly hanger-on Court-Wit. At the time, Davenant was promoting the project of an enormous new theatre near Fleet Street, a plan that would only have added to the competition faced by a struggling dramatist like Brome. In the alignment of theatrical rivalries of the day, Davenant and Brome were on opposite sides; when William Beeston lost control of his theatres and acting companies as a result of the Brome's play, control of those resources was given to Davenant by a royal warrant (27 June 1640).

Brome's play was one element in the so-called "Second War of the Theatres," a literary conflict between professional playwrights, most notably Ben Jonson, and courtly amateurs and dilettantes like Suckling. Suckling had ridiculed Jonson in his 1638 comedy The Goblins, though Jonson had died the previous year. Brome was a longstanding admirer of Jonson and a member of the so-called Sons of Ben; he was also the most politically assertive and sceptical of the professionals of his generation.

== Synopsis ==
The play's opening scene introduces Sir Andrew Mendicant and his daughter Charissa. Sir Andrew is a country gentleman who has come to London, neglecting his estates in the pursuit of wealth and preferment at Court. So far, however, his attempts have proved futile, and he is reduced to a last-gasp strategy of marrying his daughter to the prominent courtier Sir Ferdinando. Charissa wants no part of Sir Ferdinando; she is in love with Frederick, a young man of "valor, wit, and honour" — but no estate, which earns the scorn of Sir Andrew.

News arrives, however, that Sir Ferdinando has gone mad – that is to say, "more mad than all the rest" of the courtiers – apparently as a result of having his romantic suit scorned by Lady Strangelove, a "humorous widow." Sir Andrew is beset by three "projectors," who assail him with absurd get-rich-quick schemes, like a monopoly on peruke wigs, nuisance taxes on new fashions and female children, and a floating theatre to be built on the River Thames.

Act II introduces subsidiary characters in the satire. Swain-wit is a "blunt country gentleman;" Cit-wit is "a citizen's son who supposes himself a wit," while Court-wit is a "complementer," a devoted player of the game of fashion. Lady Strangelove likes to be courted, by figures like Sir Ferdinando or the talkative old Sir Raphael, who "would be thought wise." Add a Doctor and a pickpocket, and much of the middle portion of the play is dedicated to verbal interplay among the assembled forces.

Meanwhile, Frederick, disguised as a doctor, confronts the supposedly mad Sir Ferdinando. Rather than fight a duel, the courtier admits that he is feigning madness in a scheme to seduce Charissa while maintaining his pursuit of Lady Strangelove. Ferdinando additionally offers hush money that enables Frederick to marry Charissa. Since it is a comedy, the play ends happily: the final scene delivers a masque and a dance, in which the projectors are revealed to be clothed in rags under their robes. Lady Strangelove agrees to marry the newly sane Sir Ferdinando, and Sir Andrew gives up his quest for Courtly and speculative success.
