= Turner baronets of Warham (1727) =

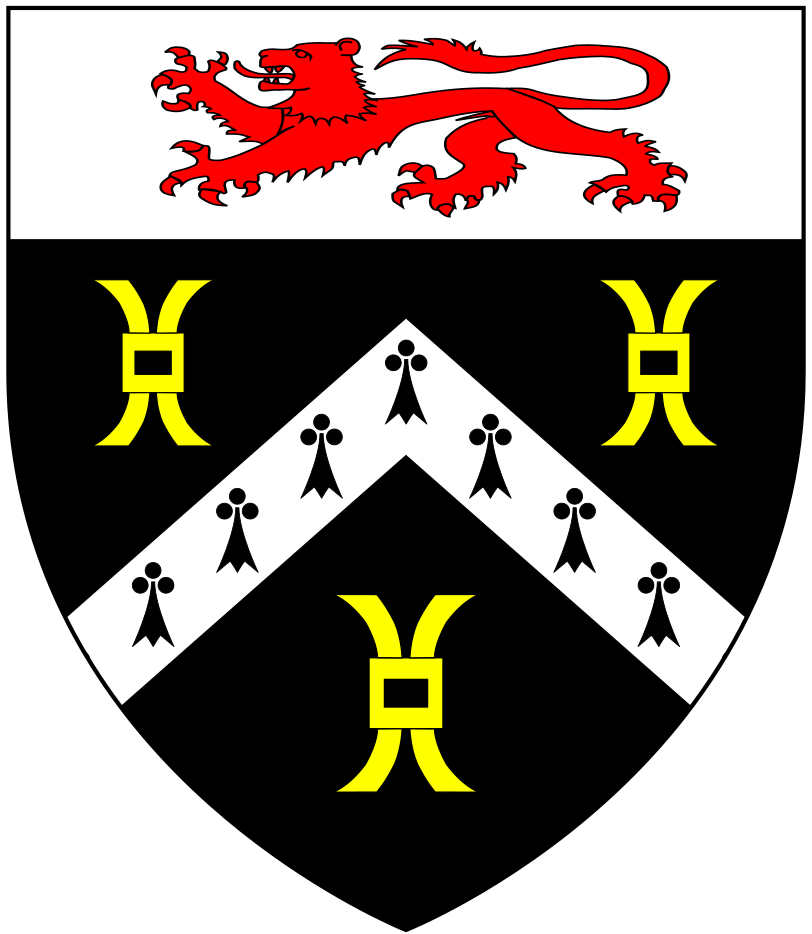
Arms of Turner baronets of Warham, Norfolk (1727): Sable, a chevron ermine between three fers-de-moline or on a chief argent a lion passant gules

The Turner baronetcy, of Warham in the County of Norfolk, was created in the Baronetage of Great Britain on 27 April 1727 for Charles Turner, from 1695 to 1728 Member of Parliament for King's Lynn.

The 2nd and 3rd Baronets also represented King's Lynn in Parliament. The title became extinct on the latter's death in 1780.

== Turner baronets, of Warham (1727) ==
- Sir Charles Turner, 1st Baronet (1666–1738)
- Sir John Turner, 2nd Baronet (1668–1739)
- Sir John Turner, 3rd Baronet (c. 1700–1780)

== Notes ==
Baronetage of Great Britain
Preceded by Hill baronets	Turner baronets of Warham; 27 April 1727	Succeeded by Gough baronets
