= Catherine Suckling =

Horatio Nelson's mother (1725–1767)

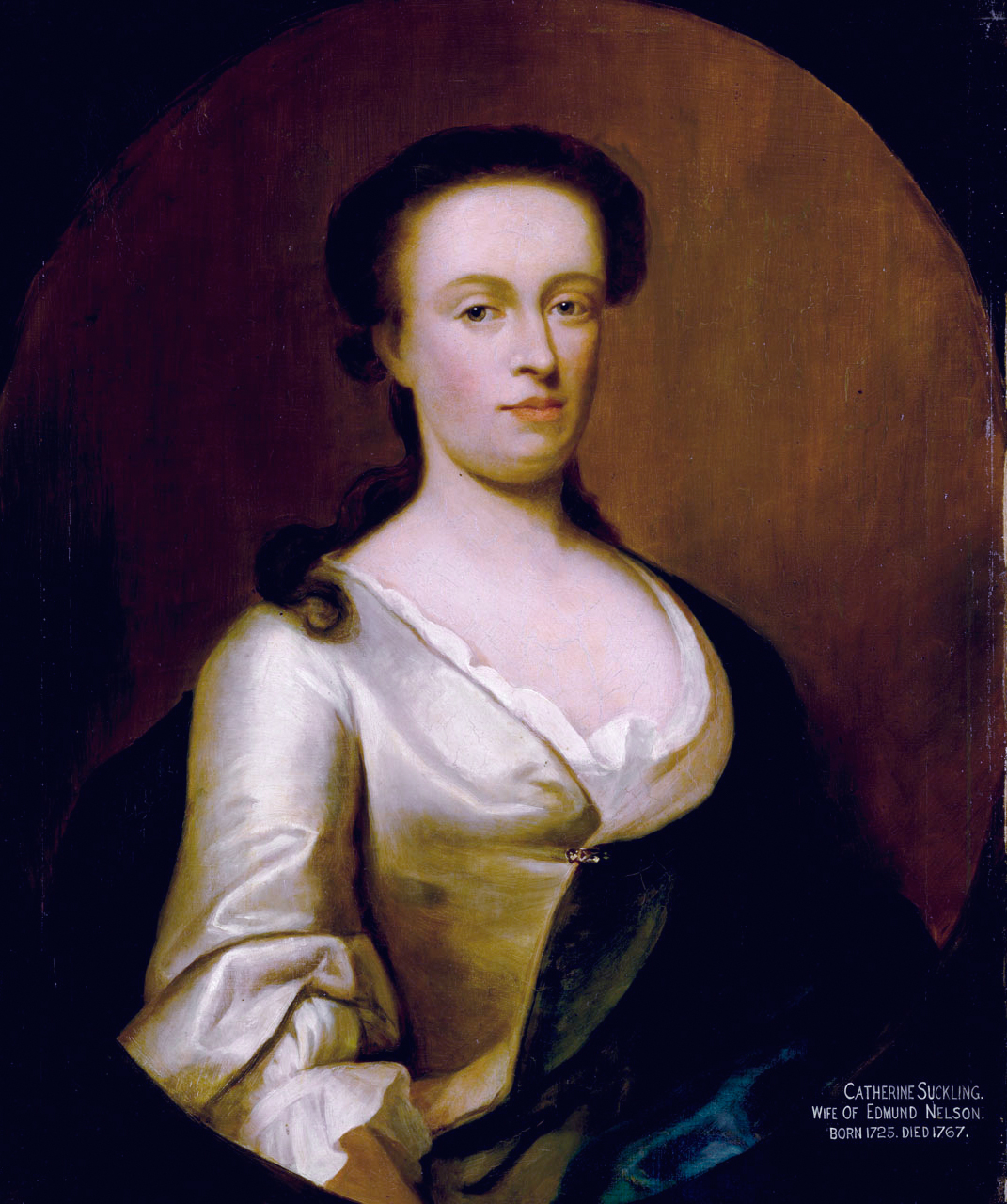
- The 18-year-old Catherine Suckling, a copy of a portrait by John Theodore Heins
- Born: 9 May 1725; Barsham, Suffolk
- Died: 26 December 1767 (aged 42); Burnham Thorpe, Norfolk
- Spouse: Edmund Nelson (m. 1749)
- Children: 11, including William and Horatio
- Relatives: Sir Charles Turner (grandfather); Maurice Suckling (brother)

Catherine Suckling (9 May 1725 – 26 December 1767) was the mother of Horatio Nelson, 1st Viscount Nelson. Catherine had eleven children of which Nelson was the third surviving son.

== Family and marriage ==
Catherine was born on 9 May 1725 in Barsham, the oldest child and only daughter of the Reverend Maurice Suckling, the rector of Barsham and Woodton, and a prebendary of Westminster and his wife, Ann Mary Turner (1693–1768), daughter of Sir Charles Turner and Mary Ann Walpole (1673–1701). Her father died when Catherine was five, and her mother took the family to live at Beccles. There Catherine met the former curate of Beccles, the Reverend Edmund Nelson. They were married on 11 May 1749.

The marriage was a good one for Edmund, for Catherine was related through her father to the poet Sir John Suckling, and through her mother to the powerful Walpole family, by now elevated to the peerage as the Earls of Orford. She was a grandniece of Sir Robert Walpole, and the Walpoles' influence had helped her brothers Maurice and William embark on successful careers.

== Children ==
The couple moved to Swaffham after their marriage where Catherine bore Edmund three children. Two died in infancy; a third, Maurice, survived. They then moved to Sporle, where on 12 June 1755 Catherine gave birth to the couple's first daughter, Susanna. Also in 1755 Horace Walpole offered Edmund the position of rector at Burnham Thorpe. Edmund accepted and the two settled at the rectory. William was born on 20 April 1757, and on 29 September 1758, Catherine gave birth to Horatio, naming him after their benefactor and the young Horatio's godparent, Horace Walpole. Horatio was a sickly child, and Edmund feared he would not live long enough to be baptised at the public ceremony arranged for 15 November. Horatio was baptised at a private ceremony on 8 October. The last of the Nelson children followed, Ann on 20 September 1760, Edmund on 4 June 1762, Suckling on 5 January 1764, and Catherine on 19 March 1767. Another boy, George, was born in 1765 but died three months later.

== Death and legacy ==
Catherine died on 26 December 1767 at the age of 42, leaving Edmund with eight children. A grief-stricken Edmund buried her four days later in the church at Burnham Thorpe. He never remarried. Catherine's mother, Ann, died shortly afterwards. Maurice Suckling, Edmund's brother-in-law, visited the rectory to attend the funerals, and found Edmund heart-broken, and fearing for the future for his children. He had begun to call in favours with relatives to ensure that educations and positions could be found for them, and Suckling promised to do what he could for one of the boys, using the patronage available to him as a naval captain. This saw the start of Horatio's successful career in the Royal Navy.

Horatio was nine when his mother died, but remembered her with fondness. He recalled a line from Henry V when he did so and said that it could be seen in the tears in his eyes. He would also recall her hatred for the French.
