= The Goblins =

Stage play by Sir John Suckling

The Goblins is a Caroline-era stage play, a comedy written by Sir John Suckling. It was premiered on the stage in 1638 and first published in 1646.

== Performance and publication ==
The play was licensed for performance by Sir Henry Herbert, the Master of the Revels, on 17 November 1638 and performed at Court three days later, on 20 November, by the King's Men, who also acted the work at the Blackfriars Theatre. It was entered into the Stationers' Register on 24 July 1646 and published in quarto later that year by the bookseller Humphrey Moseley.

== Theatre rivalry ==
The Goblins was a significant element in the so-called "Second War of the Theatres" of the 1630s. Like the original Poetomachia or War of the Theatres of three decades earlier, the Second War of the Theatres involved Ben Jonson on one side and a set of rivals on the other. In the Second case, Ben Jonson and his supporters, notably Richard Brome, represented professional playwrights arrayed against the courtly amateurs like Suckling. Suckling's ridicule of the recently deceased Jonson in The Goblins provoked Brome to ridicule Suckling in his The Court Beggar.

== The plot ==
In the mythical kingdom of Francelia, a band of robbers (the "goblins" of the title), led by their chieftain Tamoren, masquerade as devils and have the land in an uproar with their pranks. They mete out a kind of rough justice, much in the tradition of Robin Hood. As is true of many other plays of the later Caroline era, almost everything in The Goblins seems to have some precedent in other, earlier plays of English Renaissance theatre. The rivalry of two noble families immediately suggests Romeo and Juliet, for example. The play, rich in action, songs and dances, also shows the influence of The Tempest; Suckling's heroine Reginella is a version of Miranda, and the antics of the goblins depend on the precedent of Ariel.

== In the Restoration ==
During the Restoration era, The Goblins was revived at the Theatre Royal, Drury Lane in January 1667. Samuel Pepys saw the King's Company production on 22 May 1667; Charles II saw it on 21 November the same year. A century later, Richard Brinsley Sheridan adapted material from The Goblins, including the song "Here's to the nut-brown lass."
