= Louisa Capper =

English writer, philosopher and poet

- Born: November 15, 1776; Madras, India
- Died: May 25, 1840 (aged 63); Chorleywood, England
- Resting place: Rickmansworth, England
- Occupations: Writer, philosopher, poet
- Parents: Mary Johnson (mother); James Capper (father)

Louisa Capper (15 November 1776 – 25 May 1840) was an English writer, philosopher and poet of the 19th century. She is best known for her philosophical works as well as her children's literature.

== Early life and writings ==
Louisa Capper was born on 15 November 1776 at Fort St George, Madras, India. She was the youngest daughter of Mary (née Johnson) and Colonel James Capper, an officer in the army of the East India Company, known as a writer and meteorologist. Her grandfather, Francis Capper, was a London barrister; her uncle of the same name was a Church of England clergyman.

She is chiefly remembered for writing An Abridgment of Locke's Essay concerning the Human Understanding, published in 1811. Her Children's Stories however were a more profound contribution to the history of literature, marking a departure into a new populous genre in early Victorian readers. She was a pioneer of writing directly for children in a modern idiom.

A Poetical History of England (1810) is also attributed to Capper, being a versed history of England from Roman times to the start of the House of Hanover in 1714. It ran to a second edition in 1815. Her history was republished in 2012 as A Poetical History of England; written for the use of the young ladies educated at Rothbury-House School, etc, by the British Library.

== Marriage and motherhood ==
Louisa Capper married, on 16 October 1811, the Reverend Robert Coningham. His respect for her was such that on re-writing his will, he made her sole executrix and guardian. Much of his money came from slave sugar in St Vincent, where his uncle Walter Coningham had made a fortune at Colonarie Vale. Robert received a share of the money paid by the British government under the Slave Compensation Act 1837.

She gave birth to at least two children, but only one lived to adulthood: William Coningham, the art collector and politician. Her first child, John, was born in 1812 or 1813, when she was 35, and died in infancy. William was born near Penzance in 1815. She took into her household the infant James Fitzjames, and raised him as a brother to her son; he achieved fame by volunteering for the doomed Arctic exploration known as the Franklin Expedition. Through a 2010 biography of Fitzjames, much of her life has become clearer.

== Rose Hill and later life ==
Capper and her husband lived in Cornwall, then Watford, before settling in the 1820s at Rose Hill, Abbots Langley, Hertfordshire. They lived in quiet comfort, near enough to London to be in touch with cultural developments but in a pleasant country atmosphere. Rose Hill was a substantial household to run, of about 30 acres, with several indoor and outdoor servants.

The house itself, built in the 1820s, sat immediately above the Grand Junction Canal, which had opened in 1800. The London and Birmingham Railway was constructed along the same valley during the 1830s, in the teeth of land-owners' opposition. (See also the Modern history of Hertfordshire.) In the 1870s, Rose Hill was home to the civil engineer George Turnbull; it was demolished in 1952.

The Rose Hill social circle consisted of extended family and travelling friends, as well as neighbours such as the Earl of Essex at Cassiobury House. Robert Coningham's widowed mother, born Elizabeth Campbell, lived with them. His cousins included John Sterling, the writer and man of letters, and his brother Anthony Coningham Sterling, Army officer and historian. Louisa Capper's elder sister Marianne married Robert Clutterbuck, author of the county history of Hertford; the two married sisters lived near one another for many years.

Louisa was responsible for a happy and well-run home. One of her visitors was Jane Carlyle, who describes Rose Hill as a sort of Eden: "a perfect Paradise of a place, peopled as every Paradise ought to be with Angels", filled with "cheerful countenances" only too happy to cater for her every happiness.

Fitzjames's letters home refer to Louisa's and William's illnesses; she took her son to Cheltenham, Switzerland, and Boulogne in search of cures. She died on 25 May 1840 at Chorleywood and is buried at Rickmansworth, both in Hertfordshire.
