= Burnham Thorpe =

Hamlet in Norfolk, England

Coordinates: 52.936°N 0.760°E

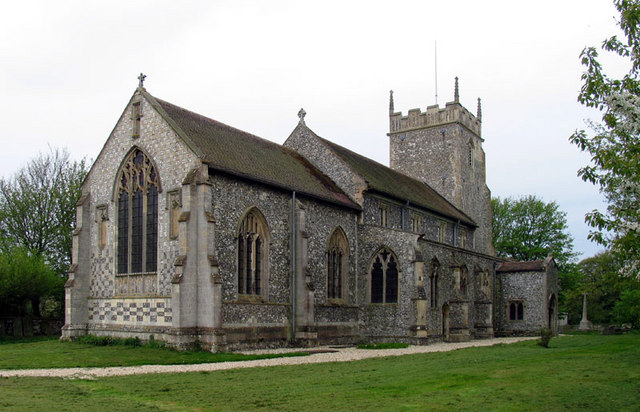
- All Saints' Church

- Location within Norfolk
- Area: 9.56 km^{2} (3.69 sq mi)
- Population: 131 (2021)
  - Density: 14/km^{2} (36/sq mi)
- OS grid reference: TF855412
- Civil parish: Burnham Thorpe
- District: King's Lynn and West Norfolk
- Shire county: Norfolk
- Region: East
- Country: England
- Sovereign state: United Kingdom
- Post town: KING'S LYNN
- Postcode district: PE31
- Dialling code: 01328
- Police: Norfolk
- Fire: Norfolk
- Ambulance: East of England
- UK Parliament: North West Norfolk

Burnham Thorpe is a village and civil parish in the English county of Norfolk. It is 19 miles (31 km) north-east of King's Lynn and 31 miles (50 km) north-west of Norwich and is one of the seven Norfolk Burnhams. At the 2021 census the population of the parish was 131, a slight decrease from 144 at the 2011 census. The village is notable for being the birthplace of Horatio Nelson, one of the most famous admirals in history. At the time of his birth, Nelson's father, Edmund Nelson, was rector of the church in Burnham Thorpe.

== History ==
In the Domesday Book, Burnham Thorpe is listed as a settlement of 58 households in the hundred of Gallow. The village was divided between the estates of William de Warenne and Robert de Verly. At the time of Domesday, the parishes of the hundreds of Brothercross and Gallow "were strangely intermixed". The boundaries between Brothercross and Gallow hundreds were eventually changed to eliminate exclaves by placing the parishes of Burnham-Deepdale, Burnham-Norton, Burnham-Overy, Burnham Sutton-cum-Burnham Ulph, Burnham-Thorpe, Burnham-Westgate, North Creake, South Creake and Waterden in Brothercross and all other parishes in Gallows. Burnham Thorpe was within the hundred of Brothercross on an 1845 map.

Horatio Nelson was born at the village rectory in 1758. He is proudly remembered in the village, with multiple monuments erected in his honour. The rectory where he was born has since been demolished, with its site being marked by a roadside plaque.

The village's public house was built in 1637 and was known as The Plough until 1798 when it was renamed The Lord Nelson in honour of the victory at the Battle of the Nile. Nelson held a dinner here for the men of the village prior to his departure to join HMS Agamemnon. The pub survives and is operated by Woodforde's Brewery.

Burnhamthorpe Road in Toronto and Mississauga, Ontario, Canada was named after Burnham Thorpe, the hometown of settler, John Abelson.

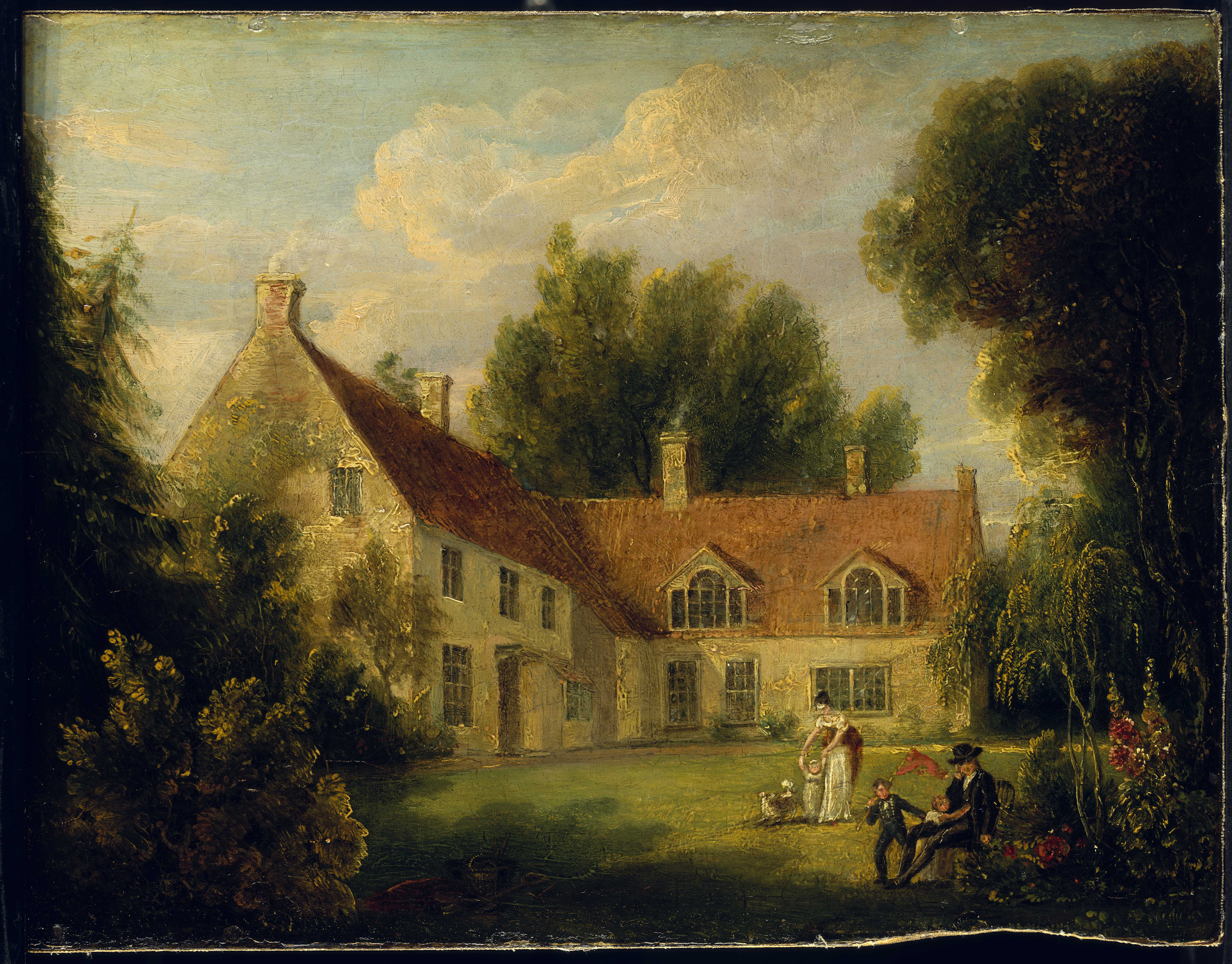
Birthplace of Nelson, now demolished; the Rectory, Burnham Thorpe

== All Saints' Church ==
Burnham Thorpe's parish church is on the site of a church which was recorded in the Domesday Book. The present building has an arcade dating from the 13th century, aisles from the 14th century and the clerestorey, north porch and chancel date from the 15th century. A bell tower of three stages at the west end also dates from the 15th century. The church is a Grade I listed building.

The church boasts several memorials to both Nelson and his father, Edmund Nelson. It has a large stone font in which Nelson was baptised.

== Notable people ==
- William Calthorpe (1410–1494), knight and High Sheriff of Norfolk and Suffolk, born in Burnham Thorpe
- Reverend Edmund Nelson (1722–1802), clergyman, rector of Burnham Thorpe from 1755
- Catherine Suckling (1725–1767), mother of Horatio Nelson, lived in Burnham Thorpe
- William Nelson, 1st Earl Nelson (1757–1835), clergyman, born in Burnham Thorpe
- Horatio Nelson, 1st Viscount Nelson (1758–1805), naval commander, born in Burnham Thorpe
- Frances Nelson (1758–1831), wife of Horatio Nelson, lived in Burnham Thorpe
- Solly Zuckerman, Baron Zuckerman (1904–1993), zoologist and researcher, took the title Baron of Burnham Thorpe
- Miranda Raison, Anglo-French actress, born in Burnham Thorpe
