= Robert Cox (actor) =

English actor

Robert Cox (died December 1655) was a seventeenth-century English actor, best known for creating and performing the "drolls" that were a permitted form of dramatic entertainment during the English Civil War and the Interregnum, when theatres were officially closed and standard plays were not allowed.

Gerard Langbaine called Cox an "excellent comedian." His origins and early history are obscure; he was with Beeston's Boys in 1639, but nothing else is known about his early life. "Cox probably was a strolling or country player..." through much of his career. Cox had one known connection with one of the theatre companies of the era: he was one of ten men who tried to re-organize the King's Men in December 1648, an attempt that, perhaps unsurprisingly, did not succeed.

Cox won his personal fame in writing and performing drolls – interludes or farces that usually consisted of comic scenes extracted and adapted from old dramas of English Renaissance theatre, by William Shakespeare (Bottom the Weaver was one droll), Ben Jonson, John Fletcher, and many others. Cox created at least eleven drolls, with titles like Simpleton the Smith, Bumpkin, Hobbinat, Simpkin, and John Swabber the Seaman. As a performer, Cox was said to have been "irresistible" in his role of Young Simpleton.

Cox performed most often at the Red Bull Theatre, long a center of popular entertainment. By some reports he bribed local officials into looking the other way when his drolls grew too much like plays. If so, he was not entirely successful in his corruption: Puritan authorities raided the Red Bull in June 1653 looking for unauthorized drama, and found Cox, playing Swabber. The gentry among the audience were required to pay five-shilling fines to exit.

A selection of Cox's drolls, including Simpleton, Oenone, and Acteon and Diana, was published by the bookseller Edward Archer in 1656. Francis Kirkman printed some of Cox's drolls in his famous collections The Wits, or Sport upon Sport (1662, 1672).
