= James Capper =

James Capper (1743–1825) was a British army officer of the East India Company, known as a writer and meteorologist.

== Life ==
The younger brother of Francis Capper, he was born 15 December 1743, and educated at Harrow School. He entered the East India Company's service at an early age, and attained the rank of colonel, holding for some time the post of comptroller-general of the army and fortification accounts on the Coromandel coast.

After retiring from military service, Capper settled for some years in South Wales, taking an interest in meteorology and agriculture. He lived at Cathays House. Moving to Norfolk, he died at Ditchingham Lodge, near Bungay, 6 September 1825.

== Works ==
Capper wrote:

- Observations on the Passage to India through Egypt; also to Vienna through Constantinople and Aleppo, and from thence to Bagdad, and across the Great Desert to Bassora, with occasional Remarks on the adjacent Countries, and also Sketches of the different Routes, London, 1784 and 1785. This work contains some details of the travels of George Matcham. John Taylor used it for his 1795 proposal of an overland mail route to India.
- Memorial to the Hon. Court of Directors of the East India Company, 1785 (privately printed).
- Observations on the Winds and Monsoons, illustrated with a chart, and accompanied with Notes, Geographical and Meteorological, London, 1801. Capper proposed in 1801 that hurricanes were a type of circular storm or whirlwind.
- Observations on the Cultivation of Waste Lands, addressed to the gentlemen and farmers of Glamorganshire, London, 1805.
- Meteorological and Miscellaneous Tracts applicable to Navigation, Gardening, and Farming, with Calendars of Flora for Greece, France, England, and Sweden, London, 1809,

== Family ==
Capper married Mary Johnson. Their eldest daughter Marianne married Robert Clutterbuck. Another daughter, Louisa (1776–1840), was known as a writer.

== Notes ==
Attribution

This article incorporates text from a publication now in the public domain: Stephen, Leslie, ed. (1887). "Capper, James". Dictionary of National Biography. Vol. 9. London: Smith, Elder & Co.
