= Sir John Turner, 3rd Baronet =

British lawyer and politician

John Turner
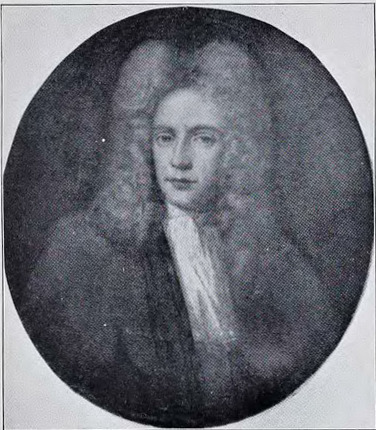

3rd Baronet
- In office 1739–1780
- Preceded by: Sir John Turner, 2nd Baronet
- Succeeded by: baronetcy extinct

Member of the British Parliament for King's Lynn
- In office 1739–1774

Personal details
- Died: 25 June 1780
- Children: 2
- Education: Christ's College, Cambridge
- Occupation: lawyer

Sir John Turner, 3rd Baronet (1712–1780), of Warham, Norfolk, was a British lawyer and politician who sat in the House of Commons from 1739 to 1774.

Turner was baptized on 19 June 1712, the only son of Sir John Turner, 2nd Baronet, of Warham and his wife Anne Allen, daughter of Thomas Allen, London merchant. He was educated at Greenwich School and was admitted at Middle Temple on 20 February 1729. and Christ's College, Cambridge on 9 January 1730. In 1736, he was called to bar. He served as mayor of King's Lynn in 1724, 1737, 1748, and 1768. He succeeded his father to the baronetcy on 6 January 1739.

Turner was returned as a Member of Parliament for King's Lynn at a by-election on 9 February 1739 in succession to his uncle, Sir Charles Turner, 1st Baronet. He voted with the Government in every recorded division. He was returned unopposed at the 1741 British general election, and won in a contest at the 1747 British general election.

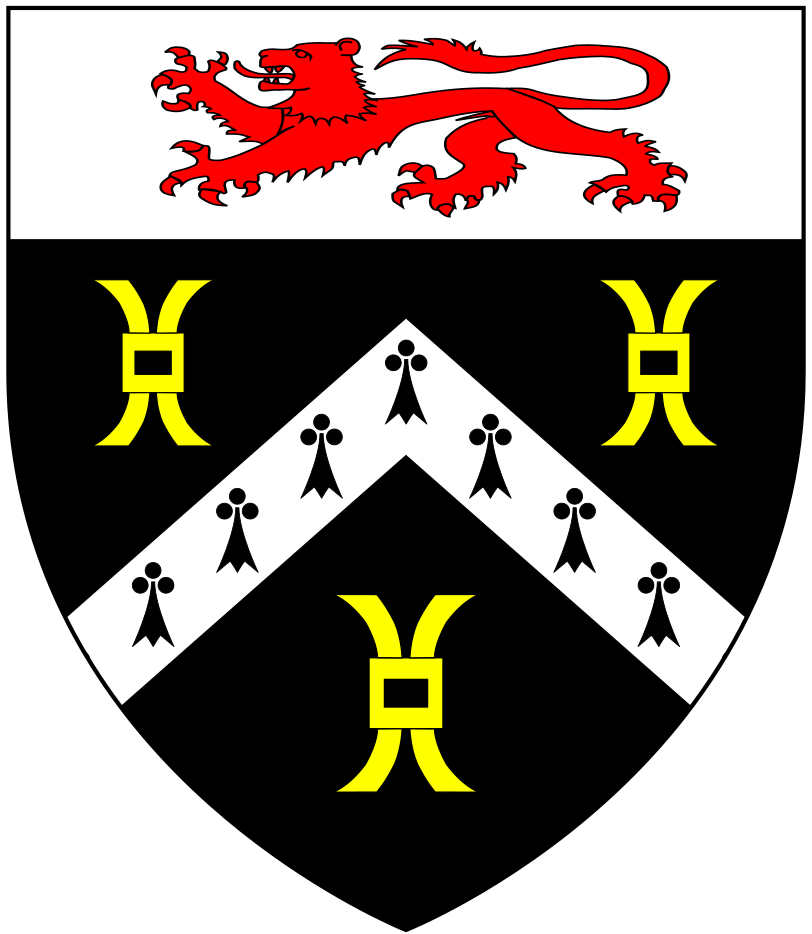
Arms of Turner Baronets of Warham, Norfolk (1727): Sable, a chevron ermine between three fers-de-moline or on a chief argent a lion passant gules

Turner married Miss Stonehouse on 20 October 1746. She died in 1749 and he married again to Frances Neale, daughter of John Neale of Allesley, Warwickshire.

Turner was returned unopposed for King's Lynn again at the 1754 British general election. On 3 May 1757, he voted for Townshend's motion on the Minorca inquiry in opposition to Newcastle and Fox. At the 1761 British general election, he was again returned unopposed. He made his first recorded speech, on 14 December 1761, to second Lord Strange's bill to make the militia permanent. He followed Bute, and in May 1762, was appointed Lord of Treasury when Bute became its first lord. He remained in office under Grenville, and supported the Administration over Wilkes and general warrants, but apparently took no part in the debates. When the Rockingham Administration took over, Turner lost his place in July 1765 and, for a while, continued to adhere to Grenville. He voted against the repeal of the Stamp Act. He became a bencher on his Inn in 1766. At the 1768 British general election, there was a contest at King's Lynn, and Turner narrowly escaped defeat. He had become unpopular both on personal grounds and because of his attitude on general warrants. He seems to have lost interest in politics, and his only known vote in that Parliament was with Administration over the Middlesex election on 8 May 1769. His interest in King's Lynn had been seriously weakened, and he decided not to contest the borough at the 1774 British general election

Turner died on 25 June 1780, leaving two daughters, and was buried at Warham. Following his death, the baronetcy became extinct.

Parliament of Great Britain
Preceded by Sir Robert Walpole; Sir Charles Turner	Member of Parliament for King's Lynn; 1739–1774; With: Sir Robert Walpole 1739-1742; Edward Bacon 1742-1747; Horatio Walpole, junior 1747-1757; Hon. Horace Walpole 1757-1768; Hon. Thomas Walpole 1768-1774	Succeeded by Hon. Thomas Walpole; Crisp Molineux
Baronetage of Great Britain
Preceded by John Turner	Baronet (of Warham); 1739-1780	Extinct
