= Robert Suckling =

English politician (1520–1589)

Robert Suckling (1520–1589), of St. Andrew's, Norwich, Norfolk, was an English politician, mercer and merchant adventurer. He was a Member of Parliament (MP) for Norwich in 1571 and 1586.

== Life ==
Suckling was born in 1520, the first son of Richard Suckling, a baker of Norwich, who served as one of the city's aldermen.

Suckling was a mercer and a merchant adventurer. He became a freeman of Norwich in 1548, and served as an alderman in 1559, as sheriff in 1564–65, and mayor in 1572–73 and 1582–83. He was a Member of Parliament for Norwich in 1571 and 1586. In 1562 he bought and rebuilt a large house in St Andrews Street in Norwich, part of which survives, incorporated into a cinema. He also had property at Woodton and elsewhere in the area.

He died in November 1589. An inventory of his property taken in 1590 included four Bibles and a copy of Calvin's Institutes.

Suckling was married three times: to Elizabeth Barwick (d. 1569), to Margaret Pettingale (d. 1576), and to Joan Cardinall, who survived him. He had five sons and five daughters from his first marriage, including Edmund Suckling, who became Dean of Norwich in 1614 and John Suckling, who was knighted in 1616 and served as Secretary of State to both James I and Charles I. Suckling also had a son, Charles (b. 1578), from his third marriage.

His memorial is in St Andrew's Church, Norwich.
