= Woodton =

Village in Norfolk, England

Coordinates: 52°29′41″N 1°22′30″E

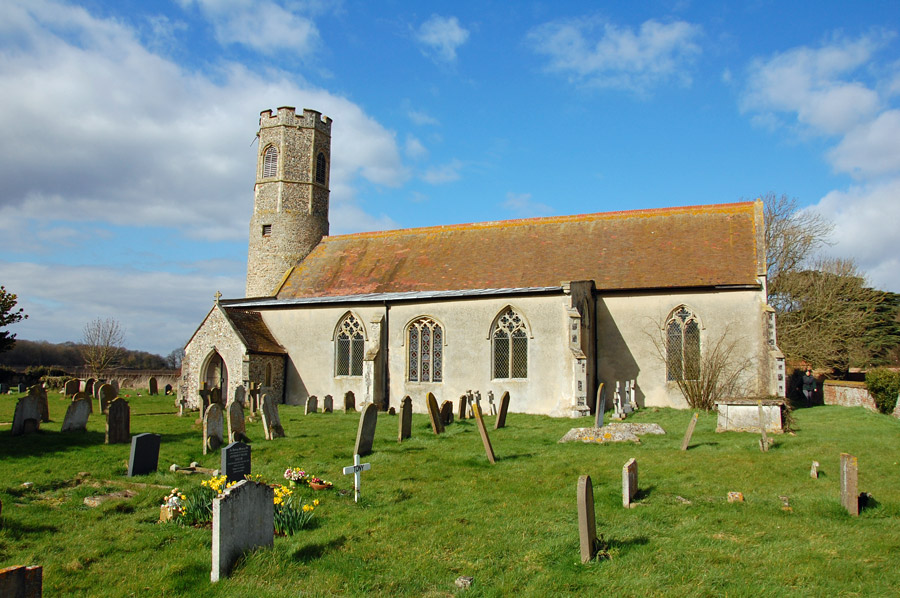
- All Saints church

- Location within Norfolk
- Area: 8.85 km^{2} (3.42 sq mi)
- Population: 702 (2018)
  - Density: 79/km^{2} (200/sq mi)
- OS grid reference: TM292939
- Civil parish: Woodton
- District: South Norfolk
- Shire county: Norfolk
- Region: East
- Country: England
- Sovereign state: United Kingdom
- Post town: BUNGAY
- Postcode district: NR35
- Dialling code: 01508
- Police: Norfolk
- Fire: Norfolk
- Ambulance: East of England

Woodton is a village and civil parish in the English county of Norfolk. It is situated 4 miles (6.4 km) north-west of the Suffolk town of Bungay, and 10 miles (16 km) south-east of Norwich.

The civil parish has an area of 3.42 sq mi (8.85 km^{2}) and in the 2001 census had a population of 472 in 194 households, increasing to 482 at the 2011 Census. For the purposes of local government, the parish falls within the district of South Norfolk.

The village's name indicates a settlement in the woods (wudu, 'woods' + tun 'enclosure, settlement, farm'). Over the years, different variants of the name have been used, including Wdetuna, Wodetuna, Wodetone, Wudetuna, Uidetuna and Wootton. Several Bronze Age ring ditches dating from between the 23rd century BC and the 7th century BC have been identified in the area.

Arms of Suckling: Per pale gules and azure, three bucks trippant or,

In 1575, Robert Suckling became Lord of the whole of Woodton. Various members of the Suckling family lived in the parish, including John Suckling (poet) and Catherine Suckling (the mother of Horatio Nelson). The Sucklings were lord of the manor until 1810. The Woodton sanctuary has a portrait of Nelson's great-great-grandmother, Ann Suckling (d. 1653), which is "beautifully and sensitively sculpted".

Wootton Hall was built in 1694 and in 1862 was listed as the seat of Robert Suckling and his wife Sarah Shelton; it was demolished in 1841–2.

== Woodton All Saints church ==
The church of Woodton All Saints is a round-tower church; the nave and chancel are from the 1300s, with a slightly more recent aisle. The roof is arch-braced and original; the chapel in the aisle must at one time have been lavish. The inside window is decorated with a bearded head and a Michaelmas-style flower motif, and there are medieval glass images of Saint Catherine and Saint Margaret. The tower has a 15th-century octagonal top.

The pulpit is Jacobean, and the piscina is an unusual 13th-century example. The glass of the east window was made by Lavers, Barraud and Westlake, for a church in Kent in the 1830s; when that church had the windows restored in 1932, the parish had a problem with the devil in the centre scene, and the Woodton rector bought the window for his own church. The window, however, did not fit perfectly, and in the end, the devil had to be excised: what is left of him is an olive-green wing under the right hand of Christ. After a restoration in 1880, a porch on the south side was added.
