= George Matcham =

English civil servant

George Matcham (1753 – 3 February 1833) was an English civil servant of the East India Company, traveller and brother-in-law of Admiral Lord Nelson.

== Life ==
Matcham was the son of Simon Matcham, Superintendent of the Marine of the East India Company, and senior member in council of the Presidency of Bombay. He was educated at Charterhouse School in England; entering the civil service of the East India Company, he subsequently became their Resident at Baroche.

His father died in 1776, and the following year his mother sailed to England. Matcham travelled overland to join her. In 1780 he returned to India, again overland. On the cession of Baroche to the Maratha Empire in 1783, Matcham retired from the Indian civil service, and he made his way to England by an overland route, much of which he had previously explored.

His travels included Persia, Arabia, Egypt, Turkey, Greece, the Greek islands, Hungary, and other countries. On one journey, with Arab guides, he rode on horseback from Baghdad to Pera (now Beyoğlu). He became known to British diplomats, and he was once presented to Emperor Joseph II. He kept journals of his travels, and an account of a journey from Aleppo to Baghdad was published with the second edition of James Capper's Observations on the Passage to India (1784), and bound together with Eyles Irwin's Voyage up the Red Sea.

=== In England ===
In 1785 he finally settled in England. In 1787 Matcham married Catherine, daughter of the Rev. Edmund Nelson and sister of Admiral Lord Nelson. They had five daughters and three sons.

The family lived in Ringwood in Hampshire, and later in Ashfold, Sussex. He devoted himself to the pursuits of a country gentleman. He patented an apparatus for preserving vessels in danger of shipwreck (patent no. 2676 of 1803), and made several communications to the government on various public improvements. Matcham died on 3 February 1833. His widow lived afterwards in Holland Park in London; she died in 1842.
