= Isabel Suckling =

British singer (born 1998)

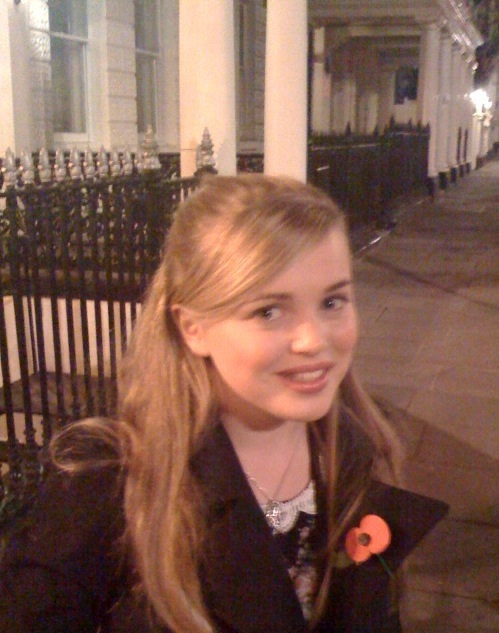
- Suckling in London, 2010

Background information
- Born: Isabel Katherine Suckling; 24 March 1998 (age 28)
- Occupation: Singer
- Label: Decca
- Website: thechoirgirlisabel.co.uk

Isabel Suckling (born 24 March 1998) is a British singer who was the youngest classical recording artist signed by Decca Records, and the first choirgirl to sign a record contract with a major music label. Suckling sang in the choir at York Minster at the time, and was discovered by Decca following a nationwide search. She was mentored by the singer, TV/radio presenter and former boy soprano Aled Jones.

Her debut album was titled The Choirgirl, and was released on 29 November 2010 ahead of Christmas sales anticipated by record executives to be lucrative. The album's first single was a cover of Michael Jackson's "You Are Not Alone", with proceeds going to the charity Age UK. Also featured was a choral recording of "Imagine" to commemorate the 30th anniversary of John Lennon's death, and a duet with Aled Jones' original 1986 vocal track on "All Through The Night", previously never released. The album was nominated for Album of the Year at the 2011 Classic BRIT Awards.

In 2012, Suckling collaborated with Robin Gibb and his son, performing the track "Christmas Day" on the Gibbs' debut classical album, The Titanic Requiem. She took part at the premiere of the album on 10 April 2012, and her vocals for the project received positive reviews.

In 2014, Suckling sang on the soundtrack for the feature film Terroir starring Keith Carradine.

Isabel Suckling is the daughter of American wine critic James Suckling.
