= James Suckling =

American wine critic (born 1958)

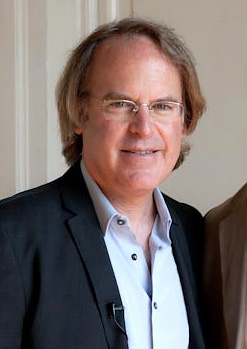
- Suckling in 2011
- Born: James Cameron Suckling; September 29, 1958 (age 67); Los Angeles, California, U.S.
- Education: Utah State University; University of Wisconsin
- Occupations: Wine critic, cigar critic
- Spouse: Marie
- Children: Jack, Isabel
- Website: www.jamessuckling.com

James Cameron Suckling (born September 29, 1958) is an American wine and cigar critic and former Senior Editor and European Bureau Chief of Wine Spectator as well as European Editor of Cigar Aficionado. Suckling is internationally regarded as one of the world's most influential wine critics, and one of the most experienced critics of vintage cigars.

== Biography ==
Born in Los Angeles, California, Suckling studied political science and journalism at Utah State University. After graduating from Utah State University, Suckling studied journalism at the University of Wisconsin, Madison where he was hired in 1978 by a local paper as a crime news gofer. Having completed his course in journalism at the University of Wisconsin he moved to San Diego, and through the influence of his father began to be interested in the world of wine. At this time Suckling responded to an advertisement for a new contributor to Wine Spectator, then a local publication with only eight hundred subscribers. Suckling joined Wine Spectator in 1981, and after a large increase of subscribers, relocated with the magazine to San Francisco in 1982.

In 1983, Suckling began blind tasting Bordeaux with Alexis Lichine, and for the first time visited Europe in 1984, visiting various leading wineries in Italy. In 1985 he was assigned by Wine Spectator to establish their European bureau, living in Paris while reviewing all European wines, especially Bordeaux wine, Italian wine and Port wine for the publication.

Suckling moved to London in 1987 where he lived for eleven years before moving to Italy. In 1990, Suckling published his book titled Vintage Port.

In press releases by Wine Spectator and Cigar Aficionado published in July 2010 it was unexpectedly announced that Suckling had retired from the publisher M. Shanken Communications magazines. Following some public criticism to the apparent dispassionate manner of the Shanken announcement, Suckling himself described the departure from the company as "totally amicable" and stated he would go on to "pursue other projects", He later published on his own Twitter account that reports of his retirement had been "greatly exaggerated" and he was "planning an exciting future".

In September 2010, Suckling announced his charity wine project ahead of the Papal visit to the United Kingdom, named One Wine One World. The project, funded by art collector and philanthropist Nasser David Khalili, aimed at bringing Jewish, Muslim, and Christian faiths closer together, with proceeds going to the Maimonides Foundation, an interfaith charity. The wines, one red and one white, were created by blending grapes from California, Mexico, Hungary, Slovenia, Roussillon and Friuli, and were to be the only wines served at the Birmingham farewell dinner for Pope Benedict XVI. The wine's label is based on a multi-faith celebratory painting commissioned by Khalili from the British artist Ben Johnson with the forthcoming Olympic Games in mind. Suckling also announced that he had been signed by IMG Artists.

The website JamesSuckling.com was launched in October 2010 and Suckling stated it would mainly focus on video content featuring "key wine figures around the world". The content had been produced over several months in collaboration with film creator James Orr prior to the launch. In addition to Suckling's reviews, the site also features blogs by Mike D of the Beastie Boys, and Jessica Harnois, president of the Canadian Association of Professional Sommeliers.

In June 2011, Suckling and IMG Artists founded Divino Tuscany, a food and wine tasting event designed to "bring together the top winemakers from Tuscany" and to "promote, share and demystify their top rated wines."

In June 2021, Suckling was knighted by France and received the Ordre National du Merite by the French Consulate in Hong Kong. The award recognizes his lifetime work with French wines and vineyards.

== Personal life ==
Suckling lives between Hong Kong, Napa Valley and Tuscany, Italy. Suckling is married to Marie Kim Suckling and is the father of two children, Jack and Isabel Suckling. Isabel was signed by the record label Decca in 2010 as a choirgirl at age 12, the youngest classical recording artist at the time. He is an avid tennis player, passionate about environmental charities and actively supports EcoDrive Hong Kong and the Sea Sheppard Conservation Society.

== Tasting style ==
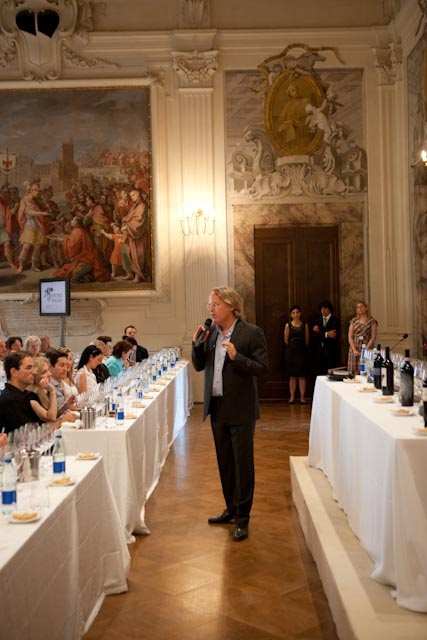
Suckling speaking at a wine seminar during the June 2011 Divino Tuscany event in Florence.

During his time with Wine Spectator, Suckling tasted an average of 4000 wines annually, half of which were Italian wines. He tasted some of them on site at the relevant wineries and others he tasted blind in his Italy office. Responding to Corriere della Sera on how he "understood, judged, and recognised a fine wine", Suckling replied, "Usually you start from the nose, from the scents of the wine. But for me, this aspect is less important. I put more emphasis on what I taste in the mouth; I find the concentration of fruit, of the tannins, the alcohol and the acid. The most revealing element is the persistence of the taste in the mouth, the aftertaste. And another thing to bear in mind is that a wine is like a person, there isn't one which is the same as the next. It should be an emotion, not something scientific. Fine wine is harmony, the balance of all the characteristics which I look for."

In reply to the Italian magazine Gentleman on "what really makes a fine wine", he replied, "wine is like music" and therefore in the same way that most musical enjoyment comes not from knowledge of music but music's appeal to the emotions, wine too should be thought of emotionally by wine drinkers, not scientifically. He added that each and every good wine should be able "to move you" in some kind of way "like with music, literature and love".

Although Suckling is a noted supporter of Bordeaux wine, as illustrated by his blog response to a Bordeaux-critical article by Eric Asimov, he also has affinity for Italian wines, having stated that he feels Italian grape varieties such as Sangiovese, Aglianico, and Nebbiolo are thoroughly unique. Conversely he has on occasion spoken dismissively of New World wines, applying the term "jam juice".

== Film ==
In 2011, Suckling, in collaboration with James Orr, produced, presented and appeared in a 53-minute documentary, Cigars: The Heart and Soul of Cuba, in which he travels across Cuba, interviewing various well-known personalities in the region. Suckling comes to the conclusion that the high quality and success of Cuban tobacco can be attributed largely to the industriousness of the Cuban people and to their culture. The film premiered at the Havana Film Festival in December 2011.

Suckling, a friend of Maynard James Keenan of Tool, appeared in his 2010 film Blood Into Wine, a documentary focusing on Keenan's efforts to make wine in Arizona. Upon tasting Keenan's wine, Suckling's reaction is enthusiastic "though not sycophantic".

Suckling also featured in Jonathan Nossiter's 2004 film Mondovino, by some accounts in an unflattering light, as he was shown near a Pinocchio sign and seeming to state he has awarded a wine 90 points because it was produced by his landlord, the winemaker Salvatore Ferragamo.

== See also ==
- List of wine personalities
