= Edmund Suckling =

Anglican Dean of Norwich

Edmund Suckling (1560–1628) was an English churchman who was Dean of Norwich from 1614 to his death in 1628.

== Early life ==
Suckling was born in Norwich in 1560, the son of Robert Suckling, a Member of Parliament (MP) for Norwich and Mayor of Norwich, and his first wife Elizabeth (nee Barwick). There is a large monument to his parents in St Andrew's Church, Norwich. He was educated at Trinity Hall, Cambridge, matriculating in 1577 and graduating BA in 1581, MA in 1584 and BD in 1591.

== Clerical career ==
He was Precentor of Norwich (1586) and then Rector of Ashill (1586-87), Larling (1592-1608) and Blofield with Hellesdon (1608-14). He was Dean of Norwich from 1614 until his death in 1628.

He was succeeded as Dean of Norwich by his nephew, John Hassal.

== Personal life ==
Suckling was married to Annie, with whom he had two daughters.

He was interred in Norwich Cathedral, with a brass, although by the time of Blomefield (1745) the brass had been lost.
