= Sir Charles Turner, 1st Baronet, of Warham =

English lawyer and Whig politician

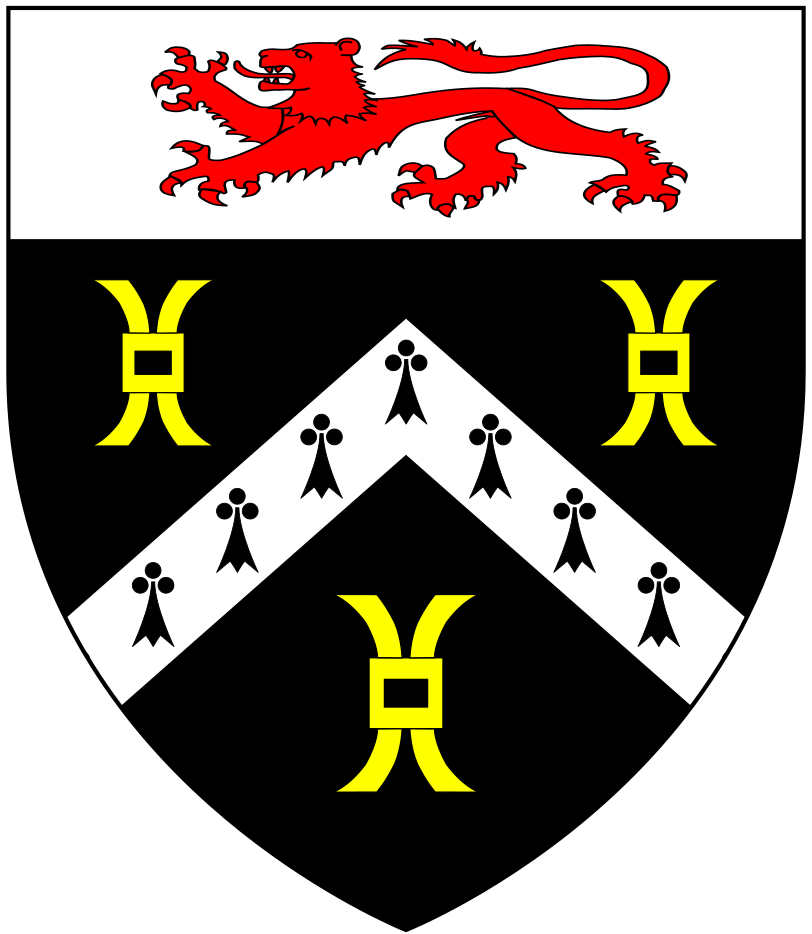
Arms of Turner Baronets of Warham, Norfolk (1727): Sable, a chevron ermine between three fers-de-moline or on a chief argent a lion passant gules

Sir Charles Turner, 1st Baronet (1666 – 24 November 1738) of Warham, Norfolk was an English lawyer and Whig politician who sat in the English and British House of Commons for 43 years from 1695 to 1738. He was a brother-in-law of Sir Robert Walpole, and held public office almost continuously from 1707. By 1730 he was the longest-serving MP in the House of Commons.

Turner was baptised on 11 June 1666, the son of William Turner, attorney-at-law of North Elmham, Norfolk, and his wife Anne Spooner, daughter of John Spooner. He was educated at Scarning and Norwich and was admitted at Caius College, Cambridge on 29 April 1681. He was also admitted to the Middle Temple on 22 July 1684 and became a country attorney like his father. His fortunes were boosted by the improving success of his own family and his influential connections, which were to include the Walpole family. In April 1689, he married Mary Walpole, daughter of Robert Walpole and sister of Sir Robert Walpole the first Prime Minister.

Turner served two terms (1693 and 1706) as mayor of King's Lynn. He helped his father-in-law's election at the 1695 English general election, when he was returned himself as Member of Parliament for King's Lynn with his uncle Sir John Turner. He was knighted on 22 March 1696. With his position unassailable, he was returned unopposed at every general election for the rest of his life. He was appointed a Lord of Trade in 1707 and was then Lord of the Admiralty from 1714 to 1717.

In 1720, Turner was appointed Lord of the Treasury. He was created a baronet on 27 April 1727. From 1729 he was a Teller of the Exchequer, retiring as Lord of the Treasury in 1730. He became Father of the House in 1730.

On June 25th 1737 the Kentish Weekly Post recorded an historical confrontation between Turner & the infamous Highway Man Dick Turpin, a transcript of the encounter reads:

"Last Week the famous Turpin met Sir Charles Turner, one of the Members for Lynn, upon Epping-Forest, as he was returning into Norfolk, and saluted him after this manner: 'Sir Charles Turner, I am Turpin, and do not design to offer you any Incivility, of rob you of any thing: In a little time I shall come to the Gallows, and hope that when I have Occasion, you will do me your best Services."

Turner's first wife Mary died in 1701 and by 1705 he married, secondly, Mary Catelyn, widow of Sir Nevil Catelyn of Kirby Cane and daughter of Sir William Blois of Grundisburgh, Suffolk. He died suddenly on 24 November 1738, at Houghton and was buried at Warham. By his first wife he had a son who predeceased him and four daughters. He was succeeded by his younger brother John.

Parliament of England
Preceded by Sir John Turner; Daniel Bedingfeld	Member of Parliament for King's Lynn; 1685–1707; With: Sir John Turner 1695–1702; Sir Robert Walpole 1702–1707	Succeeded by Parliament of Great Britain
Parliament of Great Britain
Preceded by Parliament of England	Member of Parliament for King's Lynn; 1707–1738; With: Sir Robert Walpole 1707–1712, 1713–1738; John Turner 1712–13	Succeeded by Sir Robert Walpole; Sir John Turner
Preceded by Sir Justinian Isham, 4th Baronet	Father of the House; 1730–1738	Succeeded by Sir Roger Bradshaigh, 3rd Baronet
Political offices
Preceded by Lord William Powlett	Teller of the Exchequer; 1729–1738	Succeeded by Philip Yorke
Baronetage of Great Britain
New creation	Baronet (of Warham); 1727-1738	Succeeded by John Turner
