= Turner baronets =

Set index for Turner baronets

There have been three baronetcies created for persons with the surname Turner. As of 2026 one is extant.

- Turner baronets of Warham (1727)
- Turner, later Page-Turner, later Dryden baronets of Ambrosden (1733): see Dryden baronets of Ambrosden (1733)
- Turner baronets of Kirkleatham (1782)
