= John Suckling (poet) =

English poet and playwright (1609–1641)

Sir John Suckling
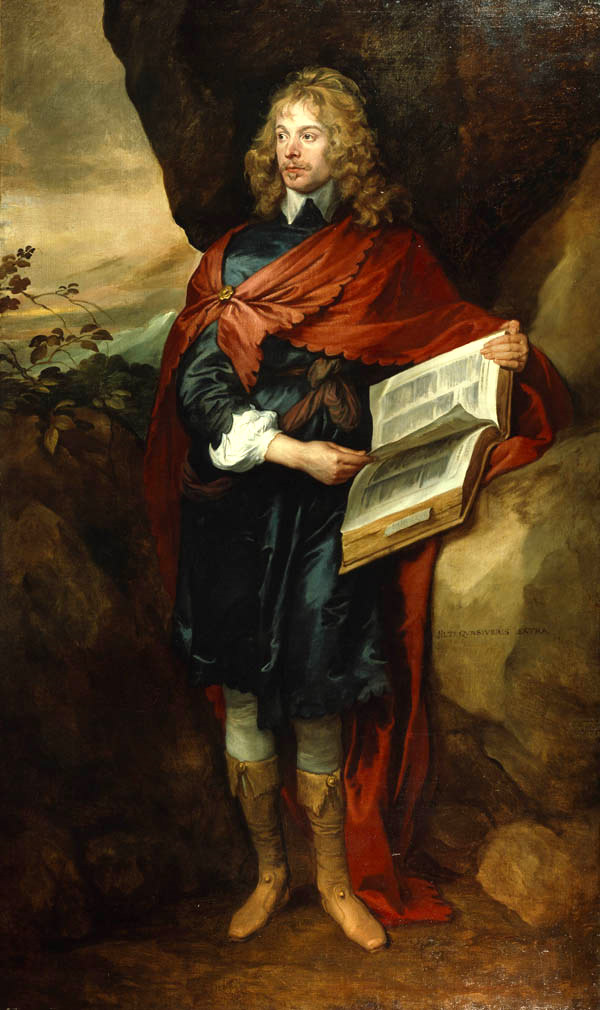
- Sir John Suckling holding the open First Folio
- Born: 10 February 1609; Whitton, London, England
- Died: May 1641 (aged 32); Paris, France
- Occupation: Poet
- Writing career
- Language: English
- Genre: Poetry

Sir John Suckling (10 February 1609 – after May 1641 (Note: or mid-1642; see Aubrey's claim in Chisholm (1911) and Seccombe (1898).)) was an English poet, prominent among those renowned for careless gaiety and wit – the accomplishments of a cavalier poet. He also invented the card game cribbage. He is best known for his poem "Ballade upon a Wedding".

== Birth ==
Suckling was born at Whitton, in the parish of Twickenham, Middlesex, and baptized there on 10 February 1609. His father, Sir John Suckling, was Secretary of State under James I and Comptroller of the Household of Charles I. His mother was Elizabeth Cranfield, sister of Sir Lionel Cranfield, 1st Earl of Middlesex.

== Life ==
The poet inherited his father's estate at the age of 18, having attended Trinity College, Cambridge from 1623 and enrolled at Gray's Inn in 1627. His intimates included Ben Jonson, Thomas Carew, Richard Lovelace, Thomas Nabbes and especially John Hales and Sir William Davenant, who later furnished John Aubrey with information about him. In 1628, Suckling left London for France and Italy, returning before the autumn of 1630, when he was knighted. In 1631 he volunteered for a force raised by the Marquess of Hamilton to serve under Gustavus Adolphus in Germany. He was back at Whitehall in May 1632, having taken part in the Battle of Breitenfeld and several sieges.

Suckling's poetic talent was one of many accomplishments, but commended him especially to Charles I and his queen, Henrietta Maria. He says of himself ("A Sessions of the Poets") that he "prized black eyes or a lucky hit at bowls above all the trophies of wit." Aubrey says he invented the game of cribbage and relates that his sisters came weeping to a bowling green at Piccadilly to dissuade him from play, lest he lose their portions.

Suckling was so passionately fond of cards that he frequently spent a whole morning in bed with a pack, studying the subtleties of his favourite games. He was not only the most skilful card-player, but also the best bowler in England. Suckling is said to have sent numerous packs of marked playing cards to aristocratic houses in England and then travelled around playing cribbage with the gentry. He managed to win around £20,000.

In 1634, scandal was caused in his circle by a beating he received at the hands of Sir John Digby, a rival suitor for the daughter of Sir John Willoughby. It has been suggested that the incident, narrated at length in a letter of 10 November 1634 from George Garrard to Thomas Wentworth, 1st Earl of Strafford, had something to do with his beginning to seek more serious society. In 1635 he retired to his estates in obedience to an order of 20 June 1632 enforced by the Star Chamber against absentee landlordism, and employed his time in literary pursuits. In 1637 "A Sessions of the Poets" was circulated in manuscript, and about the same time he wrote a tract on Socinianism: An Account of Religion by Reason (printed 1646).

In 1639, Suckling assisted King Charles I in his first Scottish war, raising a troop of a hundred horse at a cost of £12,000, and accompanying Charles on the Scottish expedition of 1639. Putnam's Monthly Magazine of American Literature states,

At the breaking out of disturbances in 1639, when the Scottish Covenanters advanced to the English borders, many of the courtiers complimented the king, by raising forces at their own expense. Among these, none was more distinguished than Sir John Suckling. These gallant gentlemen vied with each other in the costly equipment of their forces, which led the king facetiously to remark, that "the Scots would fight stoutly, if only for the Englishmen's fine clothes." The troop of horse raised by Sir John alone cost him, so richly was it accoutred, twelve thousand pounds. In the action which ensued, the sturdy Scots were more than a match for the showy Englishmen; and among those who particularly distinguished themselves by their shabby behavior, was the splendid troop of Sir John Suckling. There is every reason to believe that Sir John personally acquitted himself as became a soldier and a gentleman; but the event gave rise to [a] humorous pasquil, which, while some suppose it to have been written by Sir John Mennis, a contemporary wit, others ascribe it to Suckling himself.

The amusing "pasquil" was "On Sir John Suckling's most warlike preparations for the Scottish war" in Musarum deliciae (printed 1656).

Suckling was elected as member for Bramber in Sussex at a by-election on 30 April 1640, during the Short Parliament. It was complained he had won by "undue means", but the parliament was dissolved on 5 May in any case.

That winter Suckling wrote a letter to Henry Jermyn, afterwards Earl of St Albans, advising the king to disconcert the opposition leaders by making more concessions than they asked for. In May the following year he was implicated in the First Army Plot, an attempt to rescue the Earl of Strafford from the Tower and bring in French troops to the king's aid. This was exposed by the evidence of Colonel George Goring. Suckling left London with Jermyn and others on 6 May 1641 to flee to France; they were found guilty of high treason in their absence by Parliament on 13 August 1641.

The circumstances of his short exile are obscure and accounts of how he died vary. Alexander Pope, writing in the next century, stated he had died on arriving in Calais, of fever from a wound in his foot caused by a nail having been driven into his boot by a servant who absconded with his money and papers. He was certainly in Paris in the summer of 1641, when on 3 July Sir Francis Windebanke wrote to his son that Parliament had stopped pensions it had been paying to himself, Suckling and Jermyn. One pamphlet related a story of elopement with a lady to Spain, where he fell into the hands of the Inquisition. Generally accepted is Aubrey's statement that he committed suicide by poison in Paris, for fear of poverty. He was buried there at a Protestant cemetery. A pamphlet, An Elegy on the Renowned Sir John Sutling (sic) was written in February 1642 or earlier.

== Dramatic works ==
As a dramatist Suckling is noteworthy for applying to regular drama the accessories being used in the production of masques. His Aglaura (printed 1638) was produced at his own expense with elaborate scenery. Even the lace on the actors' coats was of real gold and silver. The play, despite its felicity of diction, lacks dramatic interest. The criticism of Richard Flecknoe (Short Discourse of the English Stage) that it seemed "full of flowers, but rather stuck in than growing there," has some weight. The Goblins (1638, printed 1646) has some reminiscences of The Tempest; Brennoralt, or the Discontented Colonel (1639, printed 1646) is a satire on the Scots, disguised as Lithuanian rebels in the play. A fourth play, The Sad One, was left unfinished due to the outbreak of the Civil War.

According to Samuel Pepys's diary (23 January 1666/67), he was persuaded to see "the dancing preparatory to to-morrow for 'The Goblins,' a play of Suckling's, not acted these twenty-five years; which was pretty."

== Poetry ==
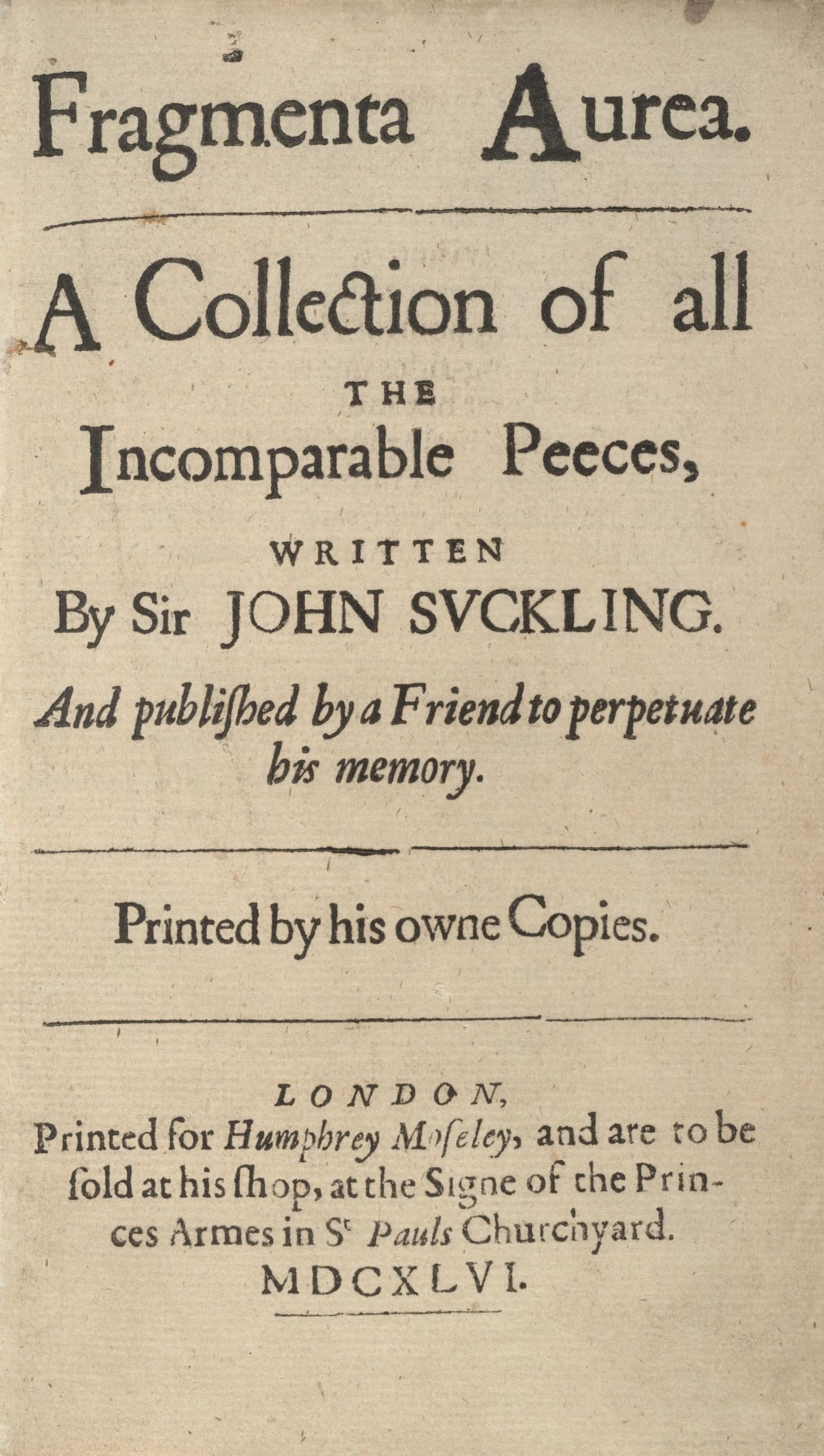
Fragmenta Aurea, 1646

Among the best known of his minor pieces are the "Ballade upon a Wedding" (for the marriage of Roger Boyle, afterwards Earl of Orrery, and Lady Margaret Howard), "I prithee, send me back my heart," "Out upon it, I have loved three whole days together," and "Why so pale and wan, fond lover?" from Aglaura.

"A Sessions of the Poets", describes a meeting of contemporary versifiers under the presidency of Apollo to decide who should wear the laurel wreath. It is the prototype of many later satires.

A collection of Suckling's poems first appeared in 1646 as Fragmenta Aurea. The Selections (1836) published by Alfred Inigo Suckling is in fact a complete edition, of which WC Hazlitt's edition (1874; revised 1892) is little more than a reprint with some additions. The Poems and Songs of Sir John Suckling, edited by John Gray and decorated with woodcut border and initials by Charles Ricketts, was artistically printed at the Ballantyne Press in 1896. In 1910 Suckling's works in prose and verse were edited by A. Hamilton Thompson.

For anecdotes of Suckling's life see John Aubrey's Brief Lives (Clarendon Press ed., ii.242).

== Sources ==
- Seccombe, Thomas (1898). "Suckling, John" . In Lee, Sidney (ed.). Dictionary of National Biography. Vol. 55. London: Smith, Elder & Co.
- Clayton, Tom. "Suckling, Sir John (bap. 1609, d. 1641?)". Oxford Dictionary of National Biography (online ed.). Oxford University Press. doi:10.1093/ref:odnb/66035. (Subscription, Wikipedia Library access or UK public library membership required.)
