= Brend (surname) =

Brend is a surname. Notable people with the surname include:

- Thomas Brend (c. 1516–1598), owner of the land on which the Globe Theatre was built
- Nicholas Brend (c. 1560–1601), owner of the Globe Theatre
- Matthew Brend (1600–1659), owner of the Globe Theatre

== See also ==
- Brenn
