= Memorial Cross =

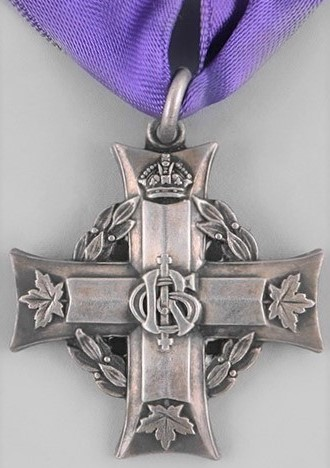
- George V version with ribbon
- Type: State decoration
- Awarded for: Next of kin of a member of the Canadian Armed Forces who died on war service, or in the course of normal duty
- Presented by: Monarch of Canada
- Status: Currently awarded
- Established: 1 December 1919
- Ribbon of the Memorial Cross (not used since 1945)

The Memorial Cross (French: Croix du Souvenir), often known as the Silver Cross for Mothers, is a Canadian decoration awarded to the mother, widow, widower, or next of kin of any member of the Canadian Armed Forces whose life is lost on active service, including peacekeeping, other such international operations and, since 2001, other service-related deaths.

== Design ==
The Memorial Cross is in the form of a sterling silver Greek cross, 32 mm across, with arms slightly flared at the ends. At the top of the vertical arm is the Tudor Crown or St Edward's Crown, symbolizing the Canadian monarch's role as the fount of honour, with a maple leaf at the end of the other arms. At the centre, within a laurel wreath, is the reigning monarch's royal cypher. The reverse is plain, with most crosses engraved with the rank, service number, initials and surname of the person commemorated.

The cross was originally worn around the neck from an 11 mm wide light purple ribbon attached to the cross by a silver ring. Since January 1945, awards have been presented with a straight silver brooch bar in place of the purple ribbon, to be worn on the left breast, above any other medals the recipient may have.

=== Design variations ===
There are four versions of the cross:

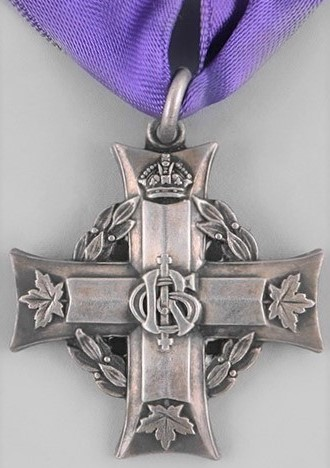
World War I: cypher 'GRI' for George V

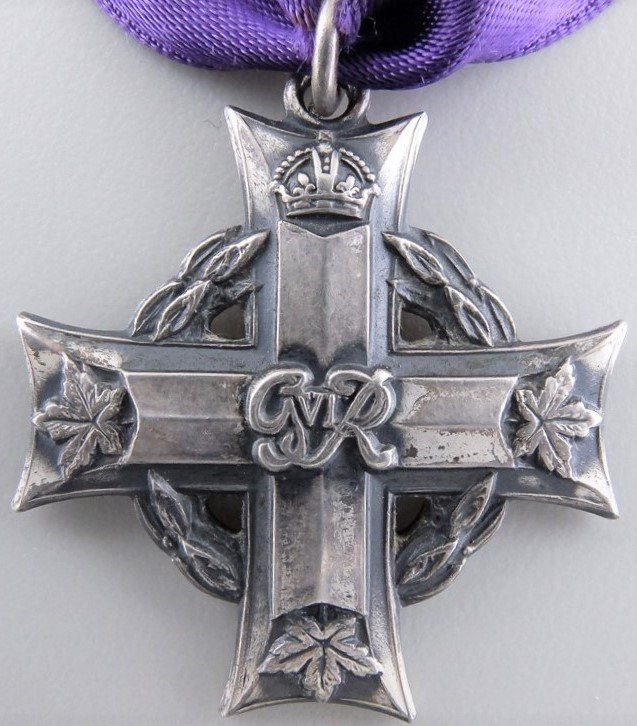
World War II: cypher 'GVIR' for George VI, on ribbon

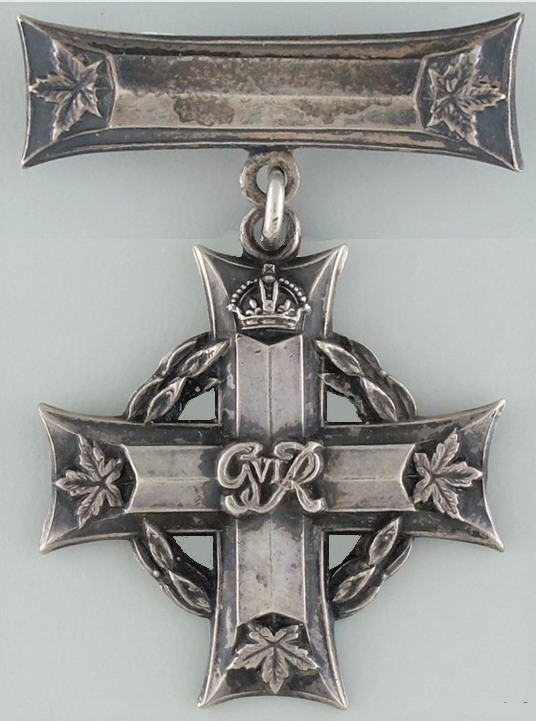
Awards from January 1945: cypher 'GVIR' for George VI, on brooch bar

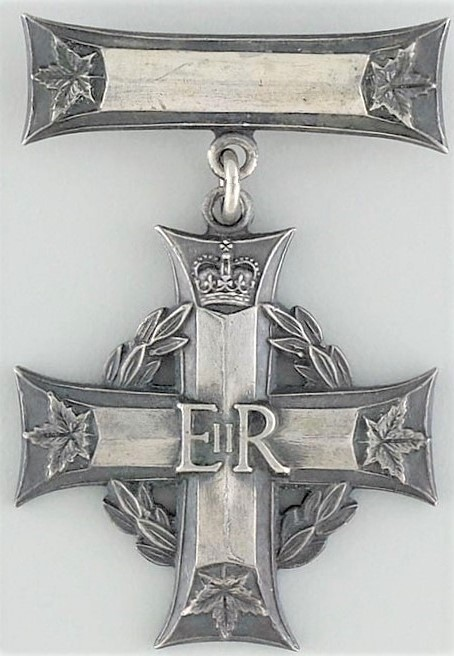
Since Korean War: cypher 'EIIR' for Elizabeth II

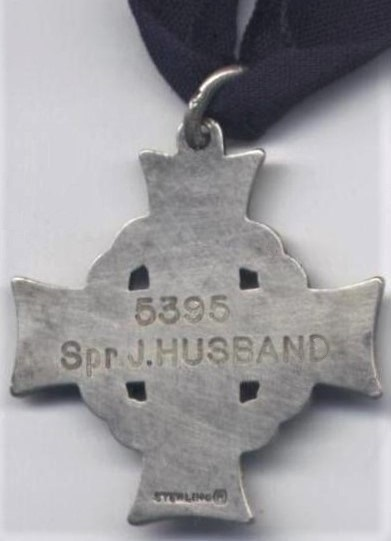
Reverse side of the cross, engraved with name of deceased

Early World War II awards bore the 'GRI' cypher used in World War I. Approximately 4,700 of this type were bestowed between 1940 and March 1942, when the 'GVIR' type were issued.

== Eligibility and receipt ==
The idea of introducing the Silver Cross for mothers whose sons died in World War I belongs to the Canadian fiction author William Alexander Fraser. He made this offer to Prime Minister Robert Borden.

On 1 December 1919, King George V, on the advice of his Cabinet under Prime Minister Borden, created the Memorial Cross as a memento of personal loss and sacrifice on the part of widows and mothers of Canadian sailors, soldiers, and airmen who had died for the country during the First World War. This included widows and mothers of those whose post-war death was related to their war service.

The award was re-established in August 1940 to cover the Second World War. Eligibility was originally on the same basis as before, but was later extended to cover merchant seamen and fire fighters. Newfoundland service personnel became eligible in April 1949, when Newfoundland joined the Canadian Confederation.

In 1950 the cross was again introduced, to recognise the Korean War, awards continuing for all other conflicts where Canada was involved. The medal was granted to a widower for the first time on 19 May 2006, when it went to Jason Beam, husband of Nichola Goddard who was killed in Afghanistan. In January 2007 the criteria for awarding the Memorial Cross were altered, retroactive to 6 October 2001, so that all service related deaths were to be recognised, not simply those occurring during overseas missions.

The regulations were again changed in January 2009, also retroactive to 6 October 2001, to allow for the award of up to three crosses to a service member's family, up from two.

The Silver Cross Mother is chosen annually from the ranks of mothers who have received the medal.

The New Zealand Memorial Cross, established in 1947, and the Elizabeth Cross, established in 2009, are awarded on a similar basis as the Canadian cross and have a broadly similar design.

== See also ==
- Orders, decorations, and medals of Canada
- Sacrifice Medal
- New Zealand Memorial Cross
- Elizabeth Cross
- List of wound decorations
