= Sigismund Zinzan =

Sir Sigismund Zinzan
- Spouse: Margaret Strelley
- Children: Henry Zinzan; Sigismund Zinzan; Robert Zinzan; Charles Zinzan; John Zinzan; Margaret Zinzan; Elizabeth Zinzan; Letitia Zinzan
- Parent: Sir Robert Zinzan

Sir Sigismund Zinzan alias Sir Sigismund Alexander was an equerry to Queen Elizabeth I and a champion in the tiltyard who participated in tournaments during the latter years of Queen Elizabeth's reign and throughout the reign of King James. He was the stepfather of Sir Matthew Brend, owner of the Globe Theatre, and during the years 1624-7 was himself the effective owner of the Globe.

== Family ==
The Zinzan family is said to have come to England from Italy or Albania. They may have been Muslims. Hannibal Zinzan was a master farrier for Henry VIII in 1547. Alexander Zinzan, possibly his brother, was a rider in the royal stables, recorded in 1547 and 1558. He and his wife and sons gave New Year's Day gifts to Mary I of England. Alexander had three sons, Alexander, Robert, and Andrew. Robert Zinzan (c.1547–1607) started his career as one of the "riding children" in 1558, and was an equerry in the royal stables of Elizabeth I by 1574. Beginning with Robert, members of the family frequently used the surname 'Alexander'.

In June 1585 the Queen sent Robert Zinzan with Edward Wotton to the court of King James VI in Scotland with a diplomatic gift of four horses and a pack of sixteen hounds. James VI was delighted. Between the years 1565 and 1591, Robert was a regular participant in tournaments at court. On 3 July 1593 he asked Lord Burghley to make him surveyor of the refiners of sugar, in accordance with similar grants made to others such as that to Dr Lopez for aniseed; some months later, in April 1594, Zinzan and a fellow equerry, Richard Mompesson, were granted a monopoly to import anise seeds and sumac for twenty years.

Robert Zinzan was knighted by James VI and I (as 'Robert Alexander') at Whitehall on 23 July 1603. In 1603, his brother or son, Alexander (also known as Andrew) was a rider of coursers. Sir Robert Zinzan died in 1607, at which time his son, Henry, succeeded him in his office of brigandery (supplier of body armour).

Sigismund Zinzan was a younger son of Robert Zinzan. According to Robert's will, the first name of Sigismund Zinzan's mother was Margaret, and her father, whose surname was Westcote, was an esquire, and resided at Handsacre Hall in Staffordshire.

Zinzan had two brothers, Robert Zinzan, who died without issue, and Henry Zinzan alias Alexander, and three sisters, Mary, Dulcibella, and another sister who first name is unknown.

== Career ==
Like his father, Sigismund Zinzan was an equerry to Queen Elizabeth I, and both he and his brother Henry participated in tournaments at court during the final years of the Queen's reign. On 27 June 1603 George Clifford, 3rd Earl of Cumberland, put on an entertainment for the new King, James I, at Grafton Regis, in which the two Zinzan brothers ran at tilt, as recorded by Clifford's daughter, Lady Anne Clifford:

From thence (Hatton Fermor's) the court removed, and was banqueted with great royalty by my father at Grafton, where the King and Queen were entertained with speeches and delicate presents, at which time my Lord and the Alexanders did run a course at the field, where he hurt Henry Alexander very dangerously.

The Zinzan brothers participated regularly in tournaments throughout King James's reign, and were tilting partners of the King's sons, Henry and Charles. During the years 1608-1624 they received £100 from the Exchequer for each tournament in which they participated; a warrant of 7 March 1619, for example, awarded them £100 'for their charges of their running at tilt' on the King's Accession Day, 24 March. Young speculates that these payments may have been granted them because they played a role in organizing the tilts. Henry Zinzan took part in tournaments over a period of twenty-seven years; he eventually petitioned the Crown for financial relief, citing as a reason his 'long service' and the 'extreme hurts he has received by Prince Henry and His Majesty'.

In the fall of 1609 Sigismund Zinzan was fined £500 in the Court of Star Chamber for causes which are not now known.

On 4 June 1610, King James' had his fifteen-year-old son and heir, Henry, created Prince of Wales 'with extraordinary pomp and solemnity'. The next day Ben Jonson's Masque of Oberon was performed, and on 6 June there was a tournament in which the Zinzan brothers were among the tilters:

The third and last day did not give place unto any of the former, either in stateliness of shew or sumptuousness in performance. The names of the tilters were these: the Duke of Lennox, the Earls of Arundel, Pembroke, Dorset and Montgomery; the Lords Walden, Compton, Norris, North, Hay and Dingwell; Sir Thomas Somerset, Sir Thomas Howard, Sir Henry Carey, Sir Sigismond Alexander and Mr Henry Alexander.

When Prince Henry died on 6 November 1612 at the age of eighteen, Sigismund Zinzan led a horse trapped with black cloth in the funeral procession.

Zinzan was outlawed for debt on four occasions, three times in 1612 and once in 1691.

The Zinzan brothers, along with the future King Charles I, are listed among those who tilted on 24 March 1620 in honour of King James' Accession Day. The last Accession Day tilt for the brothers was in 1624; King James died in 1625, and tilting on Accession Day was thereafter banned by his successor, Charles I.

In 1605 Zinzan had married Margaret Brend, the widow of Nicholas Brend, owner of the land on which the Globe Theatre was built. During the time her son, Matthew Brend, was underage, Margaret had not received the one-third of the income from her late husband's lands to which she was entitled, and in the summer of 1623 Zinzan and Brend agreed upon terms for payment to Margaret of the sums owing to her. However this settlement was almost immediately revised in September of that year when Matthew Brend was required to provide a jointure for his bride to be, Frances Smith. A new agreement was then reached under which Brend granted Margaret a life estate in his properties in Southwark, including the land on which the Globe Theatre was built. In the late fall of 1624, pursuant to this agreement, Zinzan became effective owner of the Globe in right of his wife, and continued to be so for a period of more than two years, despite lawsuits filed against him in Chancery by Brend. According to Berry, Zinzan and Brend eventually negotiated a settlement, and in any event Zinzan's interest in the Globe by reason of his wife's dower rights came to an end when Margaret Zinzan died at some time prior to 20 June 1627.

There were other frictions between Zinzan and his stepson. In 1624-5 Brend alleged that Zinzan had harvested valuable timber on the family estate in West Molesey during the nineteen-year period during which Zinzan had been 'master' there. Zinzan denied the charge, claiming he had taken only a few pollarded trees to repair buildings on the property, and for use as palings for fences.

From 1624 to 1627 Zinzan campaigned intermittently in the Low Countries. In the summer of 1624 he had a command there as captain under Robert Devereux, 3rd Earl of Essex, at a salary of £15 a month. His service was interrupted for eighteen months in 1625–6 at the command of Prince Charles, who required him in England. He returned to the Low Countries, but ceased campaigning about mid-1627.

In 1628, beset by debts, Zinzan petitioned the King for financial relief. He was granted a pension of £100 a year, to commence at Christmas in 1631, and to continue so long as the King saw fit.

During the English Civil War, Zinzan was not with the forces fighting on the King's side. Instead, he joined the Parliamentary forces of the Earl of Essex, serving in a regiment of cavalry under Arthur Goodwin during the years 1642–3.

In August 1654 Zinzan petitioned Oliver Cromwell for financial relief, claiming 'extremity of poverty' and that he was owed money by the Crown for service under the Earl of Essex. The Crown's records did not support his claim, but he was nonetheless awarded a pension of 20s a week, to commence 10 May 1655. After the Restoration of the monarchy in 1660, King Charles II renewed Zinzan's pension of 20s, but Zinzan did not live to collect it; he died about mid-July 1661 at over ninety years of age.

== Marriage and issue ==
About 1605 Zinzan married Margaret Strelley, widow of Nicholas Brend, and daughter of Sir Philip Sterley alias Strelley of Nottinghamshire, by whom he had five sons and three daughters:

- Henry Zinzan, who married Jacoba, one of the daughters of Sir Peter Vanlore of Tilehurst, Berkshire.
- Sigismund Zinzan.
- Robert Zinzan.
- Charles Zinzan, who married firstly Elizabeth Plume of Essex, secondly Elizabeth Stanton, and thirdly a daughter of one Hogg of Scotland, 'where he lives'.
- John Zinzan.
- Margaret Zinzan.
- Elizabeth Zinzan.
- Letitia Zinzan.

By his wife's previous marriage to Nicholas Brend, Zinzan had two stepsons and three stepdaughters, all minors at their father's death:

- Sir Matthew Brend, eldest son and heir, less than two years old at his father's death, who married Frances Smith, the daughter of Sir William Smith (d. 12 December 1626) of Theydon Mount, Essex, heir of Sir Thomas Smith.
- John Brend.
- Jane Brend (born c.1595).
- Mercy Brend (born 1597), who married Robert Meese.
- Frances Brend (born 1598).
