= Elizabeth Cross =

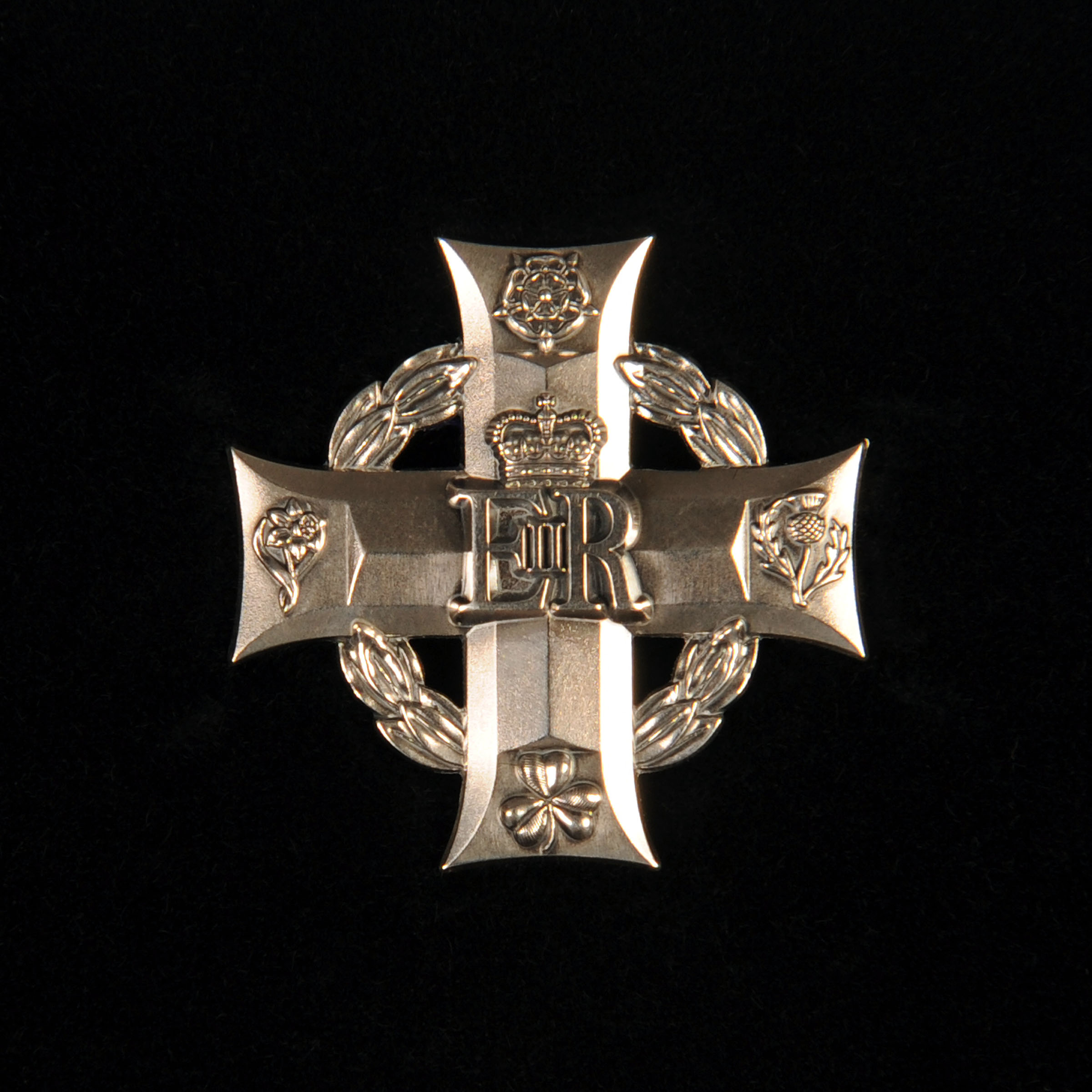
- Type: Commemorative emblem
- Awarded for: Granted to the next of kin of servicemen and women who died during operations or were killed as the result of terrorist action since the Second World War
- Description: Cross made of hallmarked silver carrying the rose of England, the Scottish thistle, the Irish shamrock, and the Welsh daffodil. The centre bears the crowned cypher of Queen Elizabeth II. The cross is backed by a representation of a laurel wreath.
- Presented by: the United Kingdom
- Eligibility: Member of the British Armed Forces killed in action or died of wounds caused by military actions
- Status: Currently awarded
- Established: 1 July 2009; 17 years ago
- First award: 18 August 2009

Highlights
- Total awarded posthumously: All awards are posthumous

Precedence
- Next (higher): N/A
- Equivalent: N/A
- Next (lower): N/A

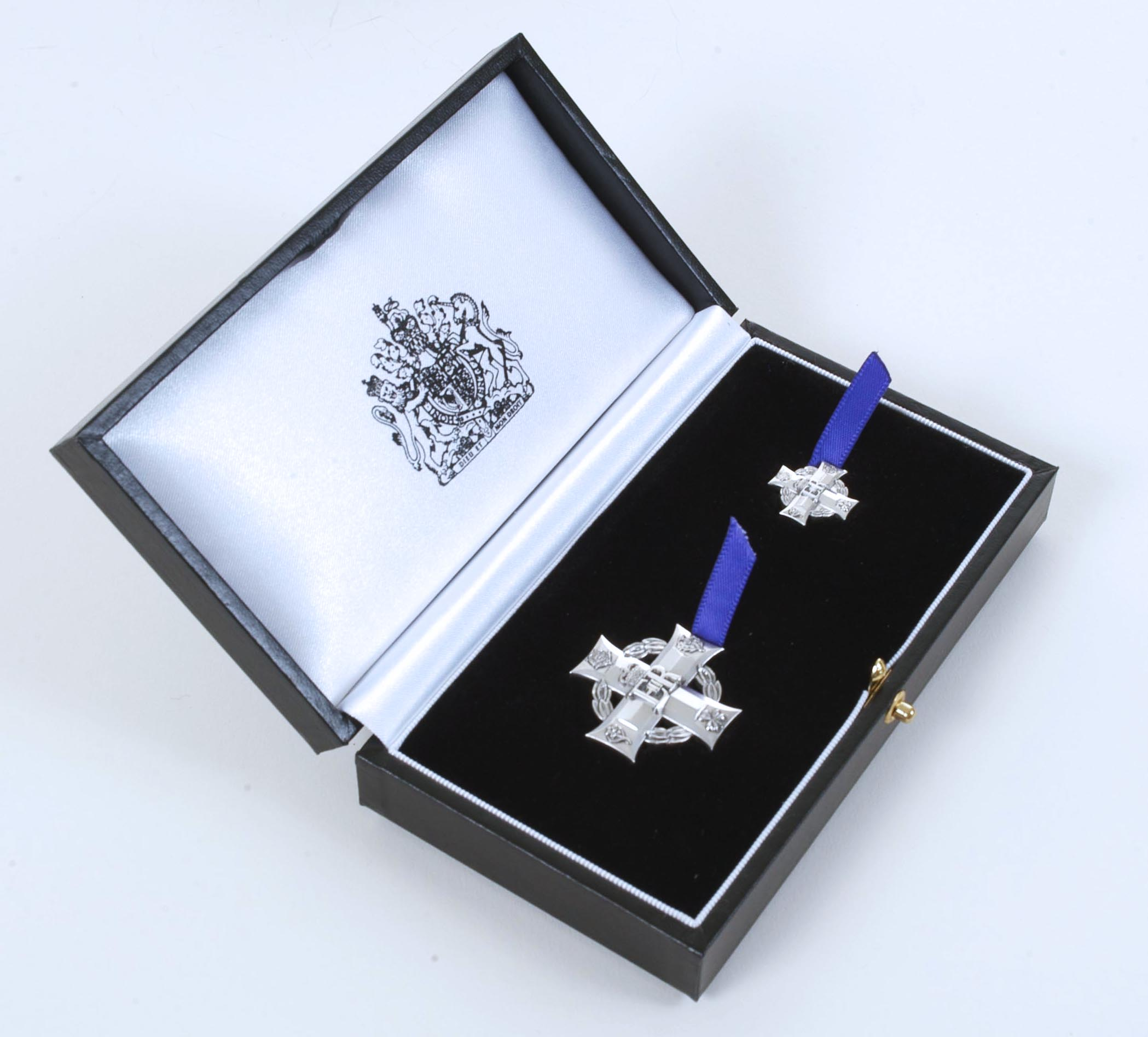
The medal, and a miniature version, are presented in a black leather-style presentation box with the royal cypher on the lid and the Royal Coat of Arms on the inner silk lining.

The Elizabeth Cross is a form of recognition given to the recognised next of kin of members of the British Armed Forces who have died on operations, or as a result of an act of terrorism since 1 January 1948, after the Second World War. It bears the name of Queen Elizabeth II.

== Appearance ==
Designed by Dayna White of Birmingham jewellers Gladman & Norman Ltd, the award is made of sterling silver in the shape of a cross backed by a representation of a laurel wreath, and carries floral emblems of England, Scotland, Ireland and Wales, an appearance similar to the earlier Canadian Memorial Cross, awarded since 1919. The trial crosses, and the first few to be issued, were made by Gladman & Norman; the company was awarded the long-term production contract in October 2009. From May 2018 the contract to manufacture the cross passed to Worcestershire Medal Service.

Families receive a large version of the cross, and a pin-on miniature, bearing the cypher of Elizabeth II.

Together with the Memorial Scroll, bearing the Royal Arms and signed by the Monarch of the United Kingdom which bears the name of the person who died.

At the time of the award’s creation, the scroll bore the words:

This scroll commemorates
[rank][name]
[branch/regiment]
who gave his/her life for Queen and country
on the [date] day of [month] [year]

The words were chosen by the previous Poet Laureate, Andrew Motion, and approved by the Chief of the Defence Staff, Air Chief Marshal Sir Jock Stirrup, and the three service chiefs.

== Institution and related awards ==
The award was instituted by Queen Elizabeth II on 1 July 2009, but eligibility is retrospective to deaths from the end of the Second World War. Previously, for those who died in the First World War relatives were presented with a memorial scroll and bronze plaque, and for Second World War and Korean War deaths, relatives received a scroll. The creation of the award was announced in a written statement to the House of Commons by Secretary of State for Defence Bob Ainsworth on 1 July, and also in a broadcast on the British Forces Broadcasting Service made by the Queen. The idea for a new award was first approved on 10 June 2008, and it was expected that the details would be confirmed later that year.

The formal royal warrant under the royal sign-manual establishing the Elizabeth Cross, dated 1 July 2009, was gazetted on 31 July 2009. Among other things, the royal warrant states that relatives of members of the Royal Fleet Auxiliary will also be eligible to receive the award.

== Award and eligibility ==
The first crosses were issued by the Ministry of Defence Medal Office at Imjin Barracks, Innsworth on 1 August 2009.

Next of kin have the choice of a public presentation by the local Lord Lieutenant or a senior officer, or a private ceremony. Only the recognised next of kin receive the cross and miniature, but other relatives are able to request the issue of additional scrolls. Awards for those killed since 2000 are processed automatically by the Ministry of Defence, relatives of those killed earlier have to contact the MoD themselves. Relatives of those killed in Korea will already have received a scroll, so are presented with the cross only.

The first public presentation of an Elizabeth Cross was on 18 August 2009 in a ceremony at Catterick Garrison. It was awarded to Karen Upton, the widow of Warrant Officer Sean Upton who was killed while on active service in Helmand Province, Afghanistan. It was presented by the Lord Lieutenant of North Yorkshire, the Lord Crathorne, and the Master Gunner, St. James's Park, General Sir Timothy Granville-Chapman.

The first presentations of the Elizabeth Cross to be made personally by Queen Elizabeth II took place on 12 September 2009.

The precise eligibility requirements issued by the Ministry of Defence are:

- Those who died from whatever cause whilst serving on a medal earning operation. Medal earning operations are those in which deployed personnel received a Campaign Medal, General Service Medal or Operational Service Medal which demonstrated the risk and rigour involved. Operations where a UN, NATO or other international body or other nations' campaign medal was accepted for wear, in the absence of a UK medal also qualify.
- Those who died as a result of an act of terrorism where the available evidence suggests that the Service person, whether on or off duty, was targeted because of his or her membership of the UK Armed Forces.
- Those who died on a non-medal earning operational task where death has been caused by the inherent high risk of the task.
- Those who died a subsequent and premature death as a result of an injury or illness attributed to the circumstances outlined above.

The service must have been undertaken on or after 1 January 1948 in general, or after 27 September 1945 in Palestine (other personnel from 1945 to 1947 were officially recognised as serving in the Second World War).

In accordance with the Royal Warrant establishing the Elizabeth Cross, it is awarded upon recommendation made to the sovereign by the Secretary of State for Defence. Thus, the judgement concerning the fulfilment of the eligibility requirements in any particular case is made by the Ministry of Defence, and the formal award of the Elizabeth Cross is ordered by the monarch upon the advice of the Defence Secretary. As directed by the Royal Warrant, the names of all those who are commemorated with the award of the Elizabeth Cross are recorded in a Registry kept by the Ministry of Defence.

Also in accordance with the Royal Warrant that established the Elizabeth Cross, the Cross and its miniature version may be worn by the recipient (i.e., the deceased's designated next of kin) at that person's discretion. In 2010, regulations were approved by Queen Elizabeth II dealing with the scenario of the designated next of kin of the deceased being himself or herself a member of the Armed Forces, and therefore making provision for the use of the Elizabeth Cross in military uniform. Under those regulations, the Elizabeth Cross can be worn on the right side of uniforms whenever other medals are worn if the recipient so chooses.

== New Zealand Memorial Cross ==
Since the Second World War New Zealand has similarly issued a cross to the relatives of those killed on active service. The New Zealand Memorial Cross was awarded to the family of the late Lt. Tim O'Donnell DSD as well as other soldiers' families who had served in Afghanistan.

== See also ==
- Elizabeth Emblem, the civilian equivalent
- List of wound decorations
- Victoria Cross
- George Cross
