= New Zealand Memorial Cross =

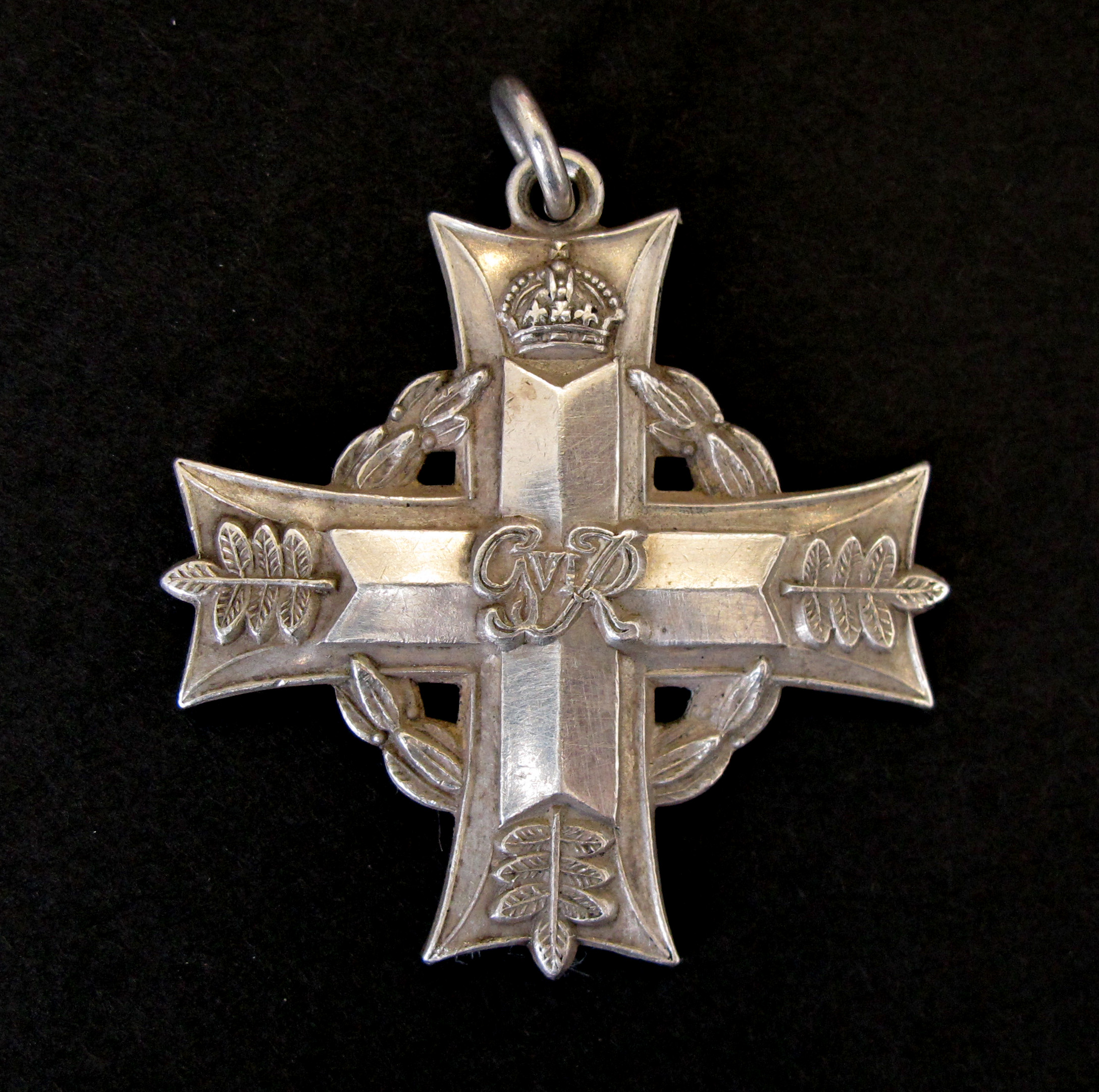
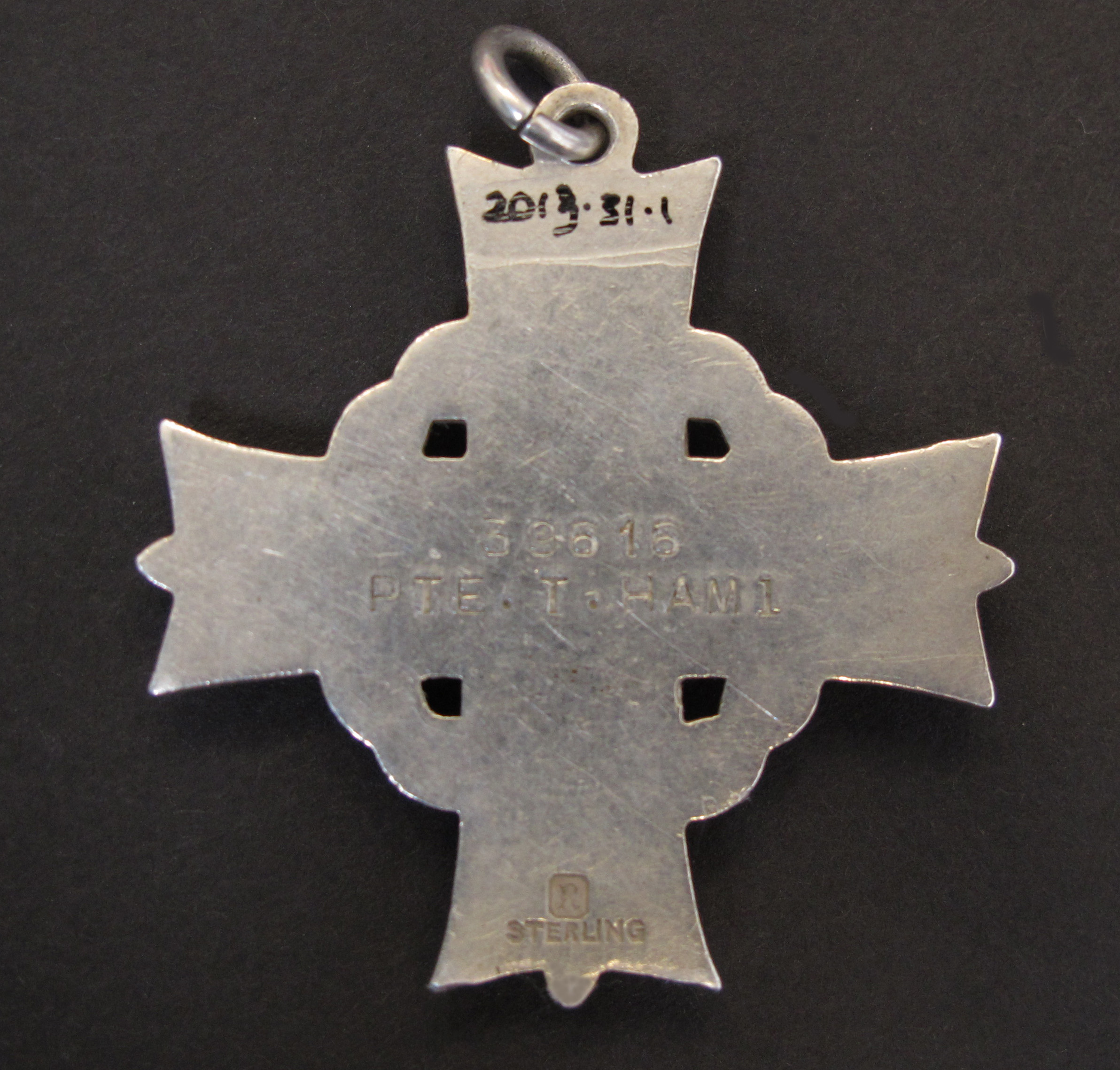
- King George VI version
- Type: Memorial medal
- Presented by: New Zealand
- Eligibility: Relatives of members of New Zealand Forces who died on war service
- Campaigns: World War II and later conflicts
- Status: Currently awarded
- Established: December 1947

Highlights
- Total recipients: 11,671 (World War II), 136 (Post-war conflicts)
- Ribbon of the NZ Memorial Cross

The New Zealand Memorial Cross is awarded to the next of kin of New Zealand service personnel who, since September 1939, have been killed on active service or later died of their wounds.

== Eligibility ==
The proposal to establish the cross was announced by the New Zealand government in December 1946, as a "small tribute of gratitude from the government and people of New Zealand in memory of those who gave their life for their country". The cross was formally instituted, and full regulations published, in September 1947.

It was awarded to family members of servicemen who died on active service during the Second World War, including those whose later death was attributable to their war service. Eligibility included both those serving with New Zealand forces and New Zealanders serving with other British Commonwealth forces, including the merchant navy.

Up to two crosses could be awarded to the family of each individual, and was intended primarily for widows and mothers. Where the mother had died, the first cross was awarded to the father, or if he had also died, to the eldest sister, or eldest brother where there is no living sister. A second cross could only be awarded where the serviceman was married – to the widow, eldest daughter or eldest son.

In September 1960, further regulations were published extending eligibility to conflicts since the Second World War. Awards have since been made relating to service in Korea, Malaya, Vietnam, East Timor and Afghanistan. In September 1995 relatives of those killed during peace keeping operations became eligible.

The cross has been awarded to the families of more than 11,671 New Zealand service personnel who died in the Second World War, with a further 136 relating to conflicts since 1945.

== Design ==
The Memorial Cross is in the form of a cross patoncé in dull silver, 32 millimetres (1.3 in) across, with arms slightly flared at the ends. A laurel wreath appears between the arms of the cross. At the top of the vertical arm is a St. Edward's Crown, with a fern leaf at the end of each of the other arms. At the centre is the reigning monarch's Royal Cypher.
The reverse is plain, with most crosses engraved with the name, rank and service number of the person commemorated.

There are two versions of the cross:

- with the cypher of King George VI, awarded for the Second World War. Worn suspended around the neck from a 12 millimetres (0.47 in) wide mauve ribbon attached to the cross by a silver ring;
- with the cypher of Queen Elizabeth II, for post-1945 conflicts. There is no ribbon, and it is awarded with a pin on the reverse to be worn as a brooch.

The design is based on the Canadian Memorial Cross, with a fern leaf replacing a maple leaf at the end of the three lower arms of the cross. A similar design is used by the United Kingdom for the Elizabeth Cross, established in 2009.

== See also ==
- Orders, decorations, and medals of New Zealand
- New Zealand campaign medals
- Memorial Cross (Canada)
- Elizabeth Cross (United Kingdom)
