= Brend (disambiguation) =

The Brend is a river in Bavaria.

Brend may also refer to:

- Brend (mountain), in Baden-Württemberg, Germany
- Brend (surname)
- Brend, a term coined by philosopher and artist Henry Flynt referring to "pure recreation"
