= Thomas Brend =

- Born: c. 1516
- Died: 21 September 1598 (aged 81–82)
- Spouses: Margery (surname unknown); Mercy Collet
- Children: Thomas Brend; Nicholas Brend; Mary Brend; Katherine Brend; Judith Brend; Mercy Brend; Anne Brend; 6 other sons 5 other daughters

Thomas Brend (c. 1516 – 21 September 1598) of West Molesey, Surrey, was a London scrivener, and the owner of the land on which the Globe Theatre was built.

== Family ==
The names of Thomas Brend's parents and his place of birth are unknown. He is known to have had one brother, also named Thomas, who was alive in 1599. Two nephews, Francis Brend, son of his brother, Thomas, and Ralph Baldwin, are mentioned in his will.

Brend was born about 1516. His family's social standing appears to have been modest. In a deposition Brend gave in 1582, the examiner described him first as 'gentleman', and then as 'esquire', both of these being subsequently crossed out and replaced by 'examinant'. From 1580 on, Brend customarily referred to himself in terms denoting his place of residence and profession, 'citizen and writer of the court letter of London', rather than in terms denoting his social status. However he was granted a coat of arms in 1591, and in his memorial inscription is referred to as 'esquire'.

== Career ==
In 1548 Brend was living in London in the house of a scrivener named William Cawkett, and was perhaps Cawkett's journeyman. As was the case with other members of his profession, Brend dealt in the London money market. According to Berry, 'the Close Rolls are littered with the bonds and mortgages with which he secured the borrowings of his clients'. Most of the bonds with which Brend was involved date from the period 1547–1558.

In 1581 Brend guaranteed a loan for Lord Admiral Howard. Brend had been requested to guarantee Howard's loan by Richard Drake, a follower of Howard's and one of the Queen's equerries. Drake in turn gave Brend a bond of £400. When Howard failed to repay the loan, Brend was forced to do so, but for reasons unknown failed to sue Drake for indemnification on the £400 bond. In 1602 or early in 1603 Brend's daughter-in-law, Margaret, then newly widowed, attempted to collect the debt from the Lord Admiral personally at Oatlands Palace. He offered a settlement of £100, which was apparently not accepted, as Margaret's second husband, Sir Sigismund Zinzan, sued Drake's heir in 1606 for the full £400.

During the years 1554–1591 Brend purchased considerable property in London and elsewhere in England. His first purchase, in October 1554, was of land in Southwark on which the Globe Theatre was later built. Brend acquired the property for £240 from John Yong, a London skinner. The property had come to Yong through his wife, Christian Rede, who had inherited it from her grandparents, Thomas and Christian Rede. Brend purchased the property in the names of himself and his first wife, Margery. Berry suggests that 'perhaps the money was at least partly hers'. In addition to Brend's purchases, the Close Rolls also record his sales of six separate pieces of property during the years from 1583 until his death in 1598.

Brend's prosperity did not pass without comment. In 1578 it was said of him that he had rapidly become wealthy as a result of 'false or subtylle dealinge'. Against this accusation must be laid the remark of a fellow lodger in the house of William Cawkett, who opined that Brend had become wealthy because of 'rich marriages he hath had'.

Brend's first wife, Margery, by whom he had ten children, died 2 June 1564, and Brend married Mercy Collet, widow of Francis Bodley (d. 1566) of Streatham, and daughter of Humphrey Collet, a bowyer who appears to have resided in Southwark, and died in December 1558. By his second wife, Brend had eight children.

Brend outlived most of his eighteen sons and daughters. He had a son and heir named Thomas alive in 1570, but by 1583 his heir was his son, Nicholas. When he made his will on 15 June 1597, he had only one son living, Nicholas, and five daughters, Anne and Judith, who died unmarried; Mary, who married Rowland Maylard and was widowed by 1601; Katherine, who married George Sayers or Seares; and Mercy (born c.1572), who married Peter Frobisher, son of Sir Martin Frobisher. Of his surviving six children, Berry considers that only Mercy was Brend's child by his second wife.

Included among the properties mentioned in Brend's will were his manor of West Molesey, Surrey; a house called the Star and other properties in Bread Street, London; a house at St Peter's Hill in London, and several properties in Southwark, including the site of the Globe.

Brend died at the age of eighty-one on 21 September 1598, according to the inscription in St Peter's Church, West Molesey.

Here lieth buried the body of Thomas Brend of West Molesey, esquire, who had by his two wives eighteen children, videlicet, by Margery, his first wife, four sons & six daughters, who died the second of June 1564, by Mercy, his last wife, he had four sons and four daughters. She left her life the 13 of April 1597, and lieth here buried. He lived the age of fourscore and one years and departed this world the 21 of September 1598 and left one son & five daughters at his death.

The armorial achievement on the brass is described as follows:

The achievement, 8 1/2 by 7 1/2 inches, bears the arms and crest of Brend, Or, a chevron between three dexter hands couped sable. Crest, out of a coronet or, a cockatrice’s head gules between two wings argent, with the usual helmet and mantling. The arms and crest were granted to Thomas Brend in 1591. The shield, 6 3/4 by 5 3/4, bears Brend impaling sable on a chevron between three hinds argent as many annulets of the field, for Collett.

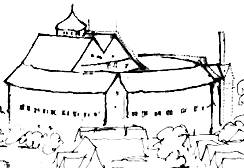
Sketch by Wenceslas Hollar of second Globe Theatre

Three months after his father's death, Nicholas Brend leased part of his father's Southwark property to Cuthbert Burbage, Richard Burbage, William Shakespeare, Augustine Phillips, Thomas Pope, John Heminges, and William Kempe. The lease agreement took effect at Christmas 1598, although it was not signed until 21 February 1599, by which time, according to Berry, 'the worthwhile pieces of the old Theatre in Shoreditch had probably been lying about the place for some six weeks, ready for assembly' into the new Globe Theatre.

Nicholas Brend survived his father for only three years. He died on 12 October 1601, leaving the property on which the Globe was built to his infant son, Matthew Brend.

== Marriages and issue ==
Thomas Brend married firstly a wife named Margery (d. 2 June 1564), whose surname is unknown, by whom he had four sons, including Thomas, who predeceased him, and his eventual heir, Nicholas, and six daughters.

Brend married secondly, Mercy Collet (d. 13 April 1597), widow of Francis Bodley (d. 1566), and daughter of Humphrey Collet. By Francis Bodley, Mercy Collet had two sons, William Bodley and Sir John Bodley of Streatham. Sir John Bodley later became involved in financial matters concerning the Globe Theatre. By his second wife, Thomas Brend had four sons and four daughters, including his daughter Mercy (born c.1572).

About 1595 Brend's son and heir, Nicholas Brend, married Margaret Strelley, a cousin of John Stanhope, 1st Baron Stanhope, and his sister, Jane Stanhope, wife of Sir Roger Townshend and Henry Berkeley, 7th Baron Berkeley. The marriage took place without Thomas Brend's consent, and his hostility to the marriage was such that he redrew his will, and struck out his son's name as executor, although he did not disinherit him.

Thomas Brend's two unmarried daughters, Anne and Judith, both died in 1599, Judith having made her last will at the house of her uncle, John Collet, on 20 April of that year. Shortly after Thomas Brend's death, by an agreement dated 17 November 1598, their brother, Nicholas, had purchased for £1150 the properties which Thomas Brend had left Anne and Judith in his will. Judith Brend's properties included the Pomegranate in Bridge Street and the Peacock in Candlewick Street.
