= Nicholas Brend =

English landowner (c.1560–1601)

- Born: c. 1560
- Died: 12 October 1601 (aged 40–41)
- Spouse: Margaret Strelley
- Children: Sir Matthew Brend; John Brend; Jane Brend; Mercy Brend; Frances Brend
- Parent(s): Thomas Brend, Margery (surname unknown)

Nicholas Brend (c. 1560 – 12 October 1601) was an English landowner who inherited from his father the land on which the Globe Theatre was built, and on 21 February 1599 leased it to Cuthbert Burbage, Richard Burbage, William Shakespeare, Augustine Phillips, Thomas Pope, John Heminges, and William Kempe. He died two years later, leaving the property on which the Globe was built to his infant son, Matthew Brend, who did not come of age until 6 February 1621.

== Family ==
Nicholas Brend, born between 22 September 1560 and 21 September 1561, was a younger son of Thomas Brend (c. 1516 – 21 September 1598) of West Molesey, Surrey, a London scrivener. Thomas Brend's social standing was initially modest; however in 1591 he had been granted a coat of arms.

Nicholas Brend was the son of his father's first marriage to a woman named Margery (d. 2 June 1564), whose surname is unknown. After his first wife's death, Thomas Brend married Mercy Collet (d. 13 April 1597), widow of Francis Bodley (d.1566) of Streatham, and daughter of Humphrey Collet.

Nicholas Brend had nine siblings of the whole blood by his father's first marriage, as well as eight siblings of the half blood by his father's second marriage. However, when Thomas Brend made his will on 15 June 1597, Nicholas's only surviving siblings were his five sisters: Mary, who married Rowland Maylard and was widowed by 1601; Katherine, who married George Sayers or Seares; Anne and Judith, who died unmarried; and Mercy, who married Peter Frobisher, son of Sir Martin Frobisher.

== Career ==
When Thomas Brend died on 21 September 1598 at the age of eighty-one, Nicholas Brend inherited a substantial estate which included the manor of West Molesey, Surrey; a house called the Star and other properties in Bread Street, London; a house at St Peter's Hill in London, and several properties in Southwark, including the site of the Globe.

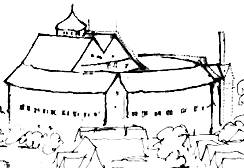
Sketch by Wenceslas Hollar of second Globe Theatre

Shortly after his father's death, Nicholas Brend leased part of his father's Southwark property for 31 years at a yearly rent of £14 10s to Cuthbert Burbage, Richard Burbage, William Shakespeare, Augustine Phillips, Thomas Pope, John Heminges, and William Kempe. The lease agreement took effect at Christmas 1598, although it was not signed until 21 February 1599, and ran until 25 December 1629. According to Berry:

Once the players had taken up their lease there, the Brends' property in Southwark seems to have been worth at least £90 a year clear, of which the players paid £14. 10s. 0d (16%). Their lease comprised two pieces of land separated by a lane, four gardens and various structures on one piece and three gardens and various structures on the other. Adjoining these pieces of land on both east and west were the other parts of the Brends' property, on which were numerous buildings during the whole history of the Globe. The whole property in 1601, two years after the Globe opened, comprised "small & ruinous howses" in thirty tenants' hands (two of whom represented the Globe), according to a man in whose interest it was to disparage them. In that year the whole property was described twice in legal documents as "All those messuages tenements howses edifices buildings chambers roomes playhowse gardens orchards void grounds and other lands and heredytaments Whatsoever." The tenants of these places were given as four gentlemen (including Richard Burbage and Shakespeare), two tanners, two watermen, two beerbrewers, and a dyer, armorer, baker, porter, draper, tailor, saddler, and one person whose work was unidentified.

Nicholas Brend's two unmarried sisters, Anne and Judith, both died in 1599, Judith having made her last will at the house of her uncle, John Collet, on 20 April of that year. Shortly after Thomas Brend's death, by an agreement dated 17 November 1598, Nicholas Brend purchased for £1150 the properties which Thomas Brend had left Anne and Judith in his will, including Judith's properties called the Pomegranate in Bridge Street and the Peacock in Candlewick Street. As Berry notes, this purchase put a strain on Nicholas Brend's finances.

By October 1601, when he fell mortally ill, Nicholas Brend was considerably in debt. At the time he estimated that he owed £1478. In fact his debts eventually amounted to £1715, and considering that several of his properties required repairs, the shortfall was in reality closer to £2150. To meet current expenses he had borrowed £105 from his sister, Mary Maylard, and had sold a small property in West Molesey for £340 to one of the Queen's Ladies of the Privy Chamber, Dorothy Edmonds.

Faced with these financial difficulties, in his final days he entered into a series of complicated transactions with his half brother, John Bodley of Streatham, his uncle, John Collet, and his friend, Sir Matthew Browne of Betchworth Castle, Surrey, under which Collet and Browne would act as his trustees, and under which:

Bodley would pay the debts and in return take a mortgage on the properties in Bread Street and Southwark, including, now, the Globe...So on October 7, Bodley, Collet, and Browne agreed in writing to pay the debts and Collet to give Nicholas £250 in cash. In return, Nicholas mortgaged his properties in Bread Street and Southwark to Collet and Browne for the supposed amount of the debts, £1478. On October 8 he signed a bond in which he promised to pay Collet and Browne £2500 if he did not perform the requirements of the mortgage. On October 10 he drew his will, providing among other things that Bodley and Browne should have various properties they would sell, including the house in St. Peter's Hill where all this was taking place...And on 12 October 1601, at the age of forty or forty-one, the first owner of the Globe died.

Brend's heir was his infant son, Matthew, who would not come of age until 6 February 1621. In his will Brend named his wife, Margaret (a daughter of Sir Philip Strelley), as his sole executor and left her the residue of his estate. As overseers he appointed his friend, Sir Matthew Browne, and his half brother, John Bodley. His will was proved 6 November 1601.

In about 1605 Brend's widow, Margaret, married Sir Sigismund Zinzan alias Alexander, one of Queen Elizabeth's equerries, the son of Sir Robert Zinzan (c.1547–1607). Margaret brought Sir Sigismund Zinzan a marriage portion of over £1000, which Berry suggests would have been 'raised out of Brend properties', and by him had four sons and three daughters:

- Henry Zinzan, who married Jacoba, one of the daughters of Sir Peter Vanlore of Tilehurst, Berkshire.
- Sigismund Zinzan.
- Robert Zinzan.
- Charles Zinzan, who married firstly Elizabeth Plume of Essex, secondly Elizabeth Stanton, and thirdly a daughter of one Hogg of Scotland, 'where he lives'.
- John Zinzan.
- Margaret Zinzan.
- Elizabeth Zinzan.
- Letitia Zinzan.

== Subsequent history of the Globe ==
Nicholas Brend's overseer and trustee, Sir Matthew Browne, died within two years; he and Sir John Townshend were both killed in a duel on horseback, and in 1608 John Collet transferred his interest in the Globe and the other properties to John Bodley, who collected the rents and 'effectively owned the Globe' until Nicholas Brend's heir, Matthew Brend, came of age on 6 February 1621.

Upon reaching his majority, Matthew Brend promptly sued Sir John Bodley in the Court of Wards and Liveries in 1622 for the return of his properties, including the Globe, and although Bodley took the position that the document signed by Nicholas Brend on 10 October 1601 had been an absolute sale, the Court ruled against him, and stipulated that the properties should be returned to Matthew Brend upon payment by him of £750 to Bodley as recompense for money owed to Bodley by Nicholas Brend and for Bodley's superintendence of the properties since Nicholas Brend's death. In the winter of 1622–3 Sir Matthew Brend sued Bodley again, this time joined in the suit by his brother and three sisters, alleging that Bodley had enriched himself at their expense during their minorities.

In the winter of 1623–4 Sir Matthew Brend married Frances Smith, and as part of her jointure conveyed to her the property on which the Globe was built, to take effect after the death of Brend's mother, Margaret.

== Marriage and issue ==
About 1595, when he was about thirty-four years of age, Nicholas Brend married Margaret Strelley, said to be the daughter of Sir Philip Sterley alias Strelley of Nottinghamshire. Margaret Strelley was a cousin of John Stanhope, 1st Baron Stanhope, and his sister, Jane Stanhope, wife of Sir Roger Townshend and Henry Berkeley, 7th Baron Berkeley. The marriage took place without Thomas Brend's consent, and his hostility to the marriage was such that when he learned of it about the middle of June 1597 he redrew his will, and struck out Nicholas's name as executor, although he did not disinherit him.

By Margaret Strelley, Nicholas Brend had two sons and three daughters, all minors at their father's death:

- Sir Matthew Brend (born 6 February 1600), eldest son and heir, less than two years old at his father's death, who married Frances Smith, the daughter of Sir William Smith (d. 12 December 1626) of Theydon Mount, Essex, heir of Sir Thomas Smith.
- John Brend.
- Jane Brend (born c.1595).
- Mercy Brend (born 1597), who married Robert Meese.
- Frances Brend (born 1598).
