= Queen Elizabeth II Platinum Jubilee Medal =

Commemorative medal awarded by the Queen

- Obverse and reverse: United Kingdom version
- Type: Medal
- Presented by: The monarch of Antigua and Barbuda, Australia, The Bahamas, Grenada, Jamaica, Saint Kitts and Nevis, Saint Lucia, Saint Vincent and the Grenadines, and the United Kingdom; The monarch of Canada via the lieutenant governors of Alberta, Manitoba, New Brunswick, Nova Scotia, Prince Edward Island, and Saskatchewan

Highlights
- Total: 10 (Australia); 7,000 (Alberta); 1,000 (Manitoba); 3,000 (New Brunswick); 1 (New Zealand) (Note: Recipients of the Victoria Cross, George Cross, Cross of Valour.); 5,000 (Nova Scotia); 584 (Prince Edward Island); 7,000 (Saskatchewan); 400,000 (United Kingdom)
- Ribbons of the medal (top: British and Caribbean version; bottom: Canadian version)

Precedence
- Next (higher): Dependent on state
- Equivalent: Dependent on state
- Next (lower): Dependent on state
- Related: Coronation Medal, Silver Jubilee Medal, Golden Jubilee Medal, Diamond Jubilee Medal

The Queen Elizabeth II Platinum Jubilee Medal (French: Médaille du jubilé de platine de la reine Elizabeth II) or the Queen's Platinum Jubilee Medal is a commemorative medal created in 2022 to mark the 70th anniversary of Queen Elizabeth II's accession in 1952.

The medal was awarded in the United Kingdom to people who worked in public service, including the Armed Forces, the emergency services, and the prison services. In Canada, six of the country's 10 provinces issued their own medals; the first time in Canadian history that a royal occasion has been commemorated on provincial medals. Outstanding volunteers, members of the Canadian Armed Forces and emergency services, and other people who made a positive impact on society were deemed eligible to receive the medals, with particular focus in some provinces on the response to the COVID-19 pandemic, reconciliation with First Nations and Inuit, and protection of the environment. The Queen's Caribbean realms also instituted a medal programme for the Platinum Jubilee. Examples of those eligible there were members of the emergency services who responded during hurricanes and the COVID-19 pandemic and of the defence and police forces.

== United Kingdom ==
=== Design ===
The medal, made of nickel silver, has the Ian Rank-Broadley effigy of Her Majesty on the obverse. The reverse shows the helm, crest, and mantling of the royal coat of arms of the United Kingdom used outside Scotland. The ribbon has silver edges, representing the Silver Jubilee; the blue from the ribbon of the Golden Jubilee medal; and the red from the Diamond Jubilee ribbon. Worcestershire Medal Service is manufacturing the medal.

=== Eligibility ===
Those who received the medal for the Queen's Platinum Jubilee were:

- Serving members of the Armed Forces who completed five full calendar years of service on 6 February 2022.
- Volunteer Reserve and ex-Regular Reservists of the Armed Forces who had received five Certificates of Efficiency.
- Uniformed cadet force adult volunteers in MOD sponsored cadet forces with 1826 days membership (not necessarily continuous) and five effective training years of which 2021/2022 must be one. An effective training year is 15 days service between 1 April and 31 March (7 in 2020/21 and 10 in 2021/22 to account for covid), with a parade evening counting as a quarter day.
- Frontline emergency services personnel who had been in paid service, retained, or, in a voluntary capacity (eg BASICS Responders), had dealt with emergencies as part of their conditions of service, and had completed five full calendar years of service on 6 February 2022.
- Prison services personnel who were publicly employed, and were regularly exposed to difficult and sometimes emergency situations, who had completed five full calendar years of service on 6 February 2022.
- Members of the Royal Household with one year of qualifying service.
- Living individual recipients of the Victoria Cross and George Cross.

Members of the Royal Family and extended family were equally eligible.

== Canada ==
Despite the idea of a medal for Elizabeth II's Platinum Jubilee gaining the support of "many Tory and NDP members [as well as] nearly 90% of government backbenchers", and "many thousands" of Canadians having written to Prime Minister Justin Trudeau and/or their member of Parliament to express their encouragement, the federal Cabinet advised against the production of a commemorative medal for the Queen of Canada's Platinum Jubilee. This was the first time in Canadian history that such a medal had not been issued, the Crown having done so for royal jubilees since at least Queen Victoria's in 1897. The decision was criticized by the Royal Canadian Legion and the Monarchist League of Canada and the provinces of Prince Edward Island, Nova Scotia, New Brunswick, Manitoba, Alberta, and Saskatchewan each instituted their own Platinum Jubilee medal.

The Governor General signed, on 3 November 2022, an order-in-council approving the inclusion of the provincial Platinum Jubilee medals in the order of precedence, per the Canadian Orders, Decorations, and Medals Directive, 1998.

=== Design ===
Depictions of the medals

The designs of the medals are similar in all the provinces that produced one, differing only in each depicting the shield of the particular province's coat of arms, as well as the province's official flower—the wild rose for Alberta, prairie crocus for Manitoba, purple violet for New Brunswick, mayflower for Nova Scotia, pink lady's slipper for Prince Edward Island, and western red lily for Saskatchewan. All are silver in colour, 32mm in diameter, and with a ring suspension. The obverse depicts the same crowned effigy of the Queen that was previously used for the Canadian Queen Elizabeth II Diamond Jubilee Medal, while the reverse displays the Queen's royal cypher with the dates of her reign—1952 and 2022—on either side, at the top. The provincial shield of arms is in the centre, on both sides of which are renderings of the official flower of the province and, appearing at the base, is the motto VIVAT REGINA ("long live the Queen!").

The ribbon uses a new arrangement of the blue, red, and white colours found in the ribbons of the Queen Elizabeth II Coronation Medal, Queen Elizabeth II Silver Jubilee Medal, Queen Elizabeth II Golden Jubilee Medal, and Queen Elizabeth II Diamond Jubilee Medal.

=== Alberta ===
The Queen Elizabeth II Platinum Jubilee Recognition Act was introduced in the Legislature of Alberta on 22 February 2022 and received royal assent on 24 March of the same year. The act included the creation of a medal to be awarded to 7,000 Albertans who had made significant contributions to society. Three minimum criteria were set for the medal recipients; the nominee must have: been a Canadian citizen or permanent resident with a tangible link to Alberta at the time the medal was granted; made a significant contribution to Canada, Alberta, or to a particular Alberta region or community; and been alive on 6 February 2022.

=== Manitoba ===
Lieutenant Governor Janice Filmon and Premier Heather Stefanson announced, on 28 April 2022, the creation of the Queen's Platinum Jubilee Medal for Manitoba, the design of which was unveiled on 2 June in the same year.

A total of 1,000 medals were awarded at ceremonies held throughout the province during the Platinum Jubilee year. There were three minimum criteria for the medal recipients: be a resident of Manitoba or have a link to Manitoba at the time of the grant of the medal; have made a contribution to Canada, Manitoba, or to a particular region or community; and have been alive on 6 February 2022.

=== New Brunswick ===
The Queen Elizabeth II Platinum Jubilee Medal (New Brunswick) was awarded to 3,000 deserving individuals; one third of the total medals were specifically intended for those who had made outstanding contributions to the province's COVID-19 pandemic response. The program was launched on 2 June 2022 and was administered by the Office of Protocol of New Brunswick.

Nominees had to have resided in the province or had a tangible link to New Brunswick; had been alive as of 6 February 2022; and must have made a significant contribution to New Brunswick or to a particular region, community, or field. A specific focus was placed on those individuals who played a significant role in New Brunswick's COVID-19 pandemic response at the local level over an extended period of time; made a tangible contribution to New Brunswick's reconciliation efforts with Indigenous peoples; made a contribution to New Brunswick's diversity and inclusion goals; provided volunteer service at the local level; served or are serving in the Canadian Armed Forces, Royal Canadian Mounted Police, and other emergency services; and/or made a positive impact on the preservation of the environment.

=== Nova Scotia ===
On 30 March 2022, Lieutenant Governor Arthur J LeBlanc announced the establishment of the Queen's Platinum Jubilee Medal for Nova Scotia. Five thousand medals were awarded across the province until 5 February 2023. LeBlanc announced on 2 June that the Queen had approved the design of the medal. On the same day, the names of the first 70 recipients were released and the inaugural investiture ceremony took place at the Westin Nova Scotian hotel in Halifax on 4 August.

To be eligible for the medal, a person must have been a resident of Nova Scotia or have had a strong direct connection with the province; have made a significant contribution to Canada, Nova Scotia, or to a particular region or community; and been alive on 6 February 2022.

=== Prince Edward Island ===
The Queen Elizabeth II Platinum Jubilee Medal programme in Prince Edward Island saw a total of 584 medals distributed to Islanders. The programme ran to the end of the Queen's Platinum Jubilee Year, 5 February 2023.

Eligible recipients must have resided in the province or had a tangible link to Prince Edward Island; made a significant contribution to Prince Edward Island, a region, community, or a field; and been alive on 6 February 2022. Medals were awarded to those who had also devoted themselves to making the province a better place and made a significant contribution, which included providing volunteer service at the local level; contributing to the province's reconciliation efforts with indigenous peoples; contributing to the province's diversity and inclusion goals, including the promotion of the Acadian and Francophone community; served in the Canadian Armed Forces, Royal Canadian Mounted Police, and/or emergency services; and/or made a positive impact on the preservation of the environment.

=== Saskatchewan ===
Lieutenant Governor Russell Mirasty announced on 30 March 2022 the creation of the Queen Elizabeth II Platinum Jubilee Medal (Saskatchewan), which honoured significant contributions and achievements throughout Saskatchewan; 7,000 medals were awarded throughout the province. The inaugural investiture took place in the Regency Ballroom of the Hotel Saskatchewan, in Regina, on 30 August, during which Mirasty presented 70 Saskatchewanians with jubilee medals.

The three minimum criteria for the medal recipients were: be a resident of Saskatchewan or have had a link to Saskatchewan at the time of the grant of the medal; have made a contribution to Canada, Saskatchewan, or to a particular region or community; and have been alive on 6 February 2022.

== Caribbean ==
The Queen's Caribbean realms also instituted a medal programme for the Platinum Jubilee.

The obverse bears the same effigy of the Queen as does the British medal circumscribed by the words PLATINUM JUBILEE HM QUEEN ELIZABETH II. The ribbon of the Caribbean medal is similar to the British version, with silver edges, representing the Silver Jubilee; the blue from the ribbon of the Golden Jubilee medal; and the red from the Diamond Jubilee medal ribbon.

=== Antigua and Barbuda ===
During their visit to Antigua and Barbuda on 25 April, the Earl and Countess of Wessex and Forfar presented Platinum Jubilee medals to three people at Government House to recognise their service to national security.

=== Belize ===
Serving frontline members for their service during Hurricanes Eta and Iota and, more recently, to those who served during the COVID-19 pandemic.

=== Jamaica ===
In Jamaica, Platinum Jubilee medals were awarded to members of the Jamaica Defence Force, the Jamaica Constabulary Force, the Department of Correctional Services, the Jamaica Fire Brigade and the Emergency Medical Services.

On 29 July 2022, Governor-General Sir Patrick Allen presented jubilee medals during the Armed Forces Day Parade at Up Park Camp in Kingston. A total of 1056 members of the Jamaica Defence Force, including one woman, were acknowledged with the Queen's Platinum Jubilee Medal. This was awarded to service members of the Regular and Reserve Force, who completed 18 years of service on 6 February 2022.

== Precedence in each realm ==
Some orders of precedence are as follows:

Country	Preceding	Following
(Australia) Australia; Order of precedence	Queen Elizabeth II Diamond Jubilee Medal	King Charles III Coronation Medal
(Canada) Canada; Order of precedence	Alberta Centennial Medal	Last in precedence
New Zealand	Queen Elizabeth II Diamond Jubilee Medal	King Charles III Coronation Medal
(United Kingdom) United Kingdom; Order of precedence	Queen Elizabeth II Diamond Jubilee Medal	King Charles III Coronation Medal

== See also ==
- Queen Elizabeth II Coronation Medal
- Queen Elizabeth II Silver Jubilee Medal
- Queen Elizabeth II Golden Jubilee Medal
- Queen Elizabeth II Diamond Jubilee Medal
- List of monarchs in Britain by length of reign
- List of jubilees of British monarchs
