= Dower =

Assets reserved for a wife in case her husband dies

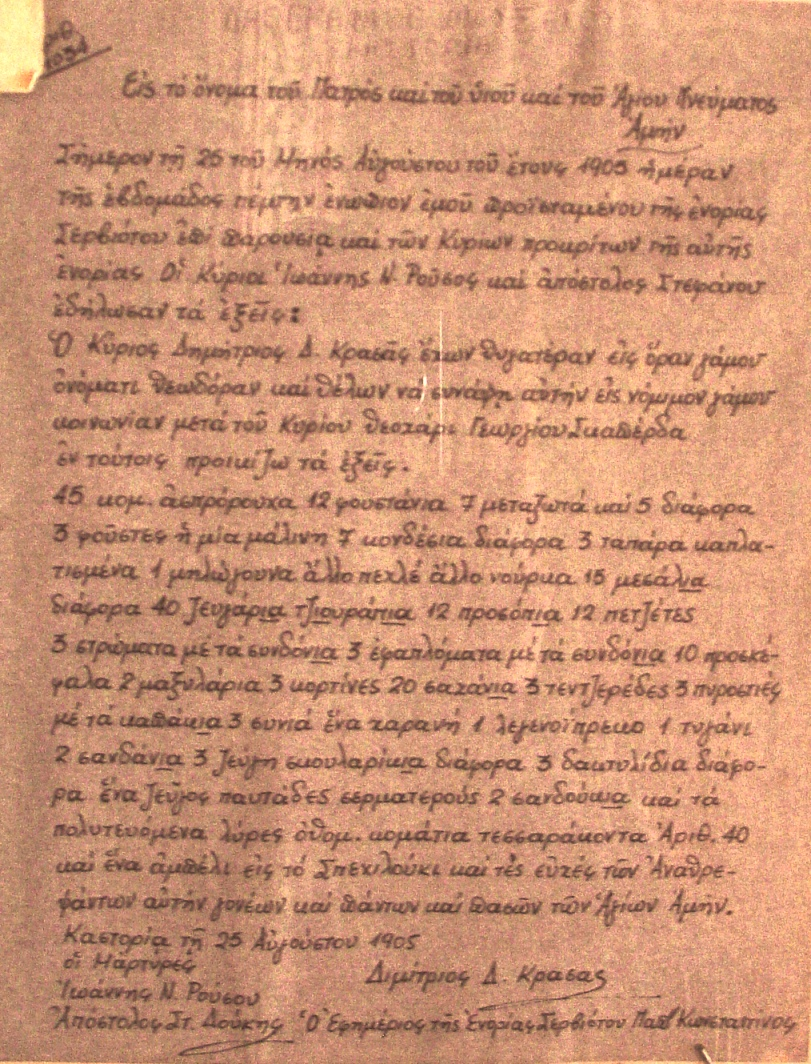
Dower agreement (Proikosymfono) before wedding at Kastoria, Greece, (1905). Source: Folkloric Museum of Kastoria

Dower is a provision accorded traditionally by a husband or his family, to a wife for her support should she become widowed. It was settled on the bride (being given into trust) by agreement at the time of the wedding, or as provided by law.

The dower grew out of the practice of bride price, which was given over to a bride's family well in advance for arranging the marriage, but during the early Middle Ages, was given directly to the bride instead. However, in popular parlance, the term may be used for a life interest in property settled by a husband on his wife at any time, not just at the wedding. The verb to dower is sometimes used.

In popular usage, the term dower may be confused with:

- A dowager is a widow (who may receive her dower). The term is especially used of a noble or royal widow who no longer occupies the position she held during the marriage. For example, Queen Elizabeth was technically the dowager queen after the death of George VI (though she was referred to by the more informal title "queen mother"), and Princess Lilian was the Dowager Duchess of Halland in heraldic parlance. Such a dowager will receive the income from her dower property. (The term "Empress Dowager", in Chinese history, has a different meaning.)
- Property brought to the marriage by the bride is called a dowry. But the word dower has been used since Chaucer (The Clerk's Tale) in the sense of dowry, and is recognized as a definition of dower in the Oxford English Dictionary.
- Property made over to the bride's family at the time of the wedding is a bride price. This property does not pass to the bride herself.

== Meaning Of Dower ==
Being for the wife/spouse and being accorded by law, dower differs essentially from a conventional marriage portion such as the English dowry (cf. Roman dos, Byzantine proíx, Italian dote, French dot, Dutch bruidsschat, German Mitgift).

The bride received a right to certain property from the bridegroom or his family. It was intended to ensure her livelihood in widowhood, and it was to be kept separate and in the wife's possession.

Dower is the gift given by the groom to the bride, customarily on the morning after the wedding, though all dowerings from the man to his fiancée, either during the betrothal period, or wedding, during marriage or afterwards, even as late as in the testamentary dowering, are understood as dowers if specifically intended for the maintenance of the wife.

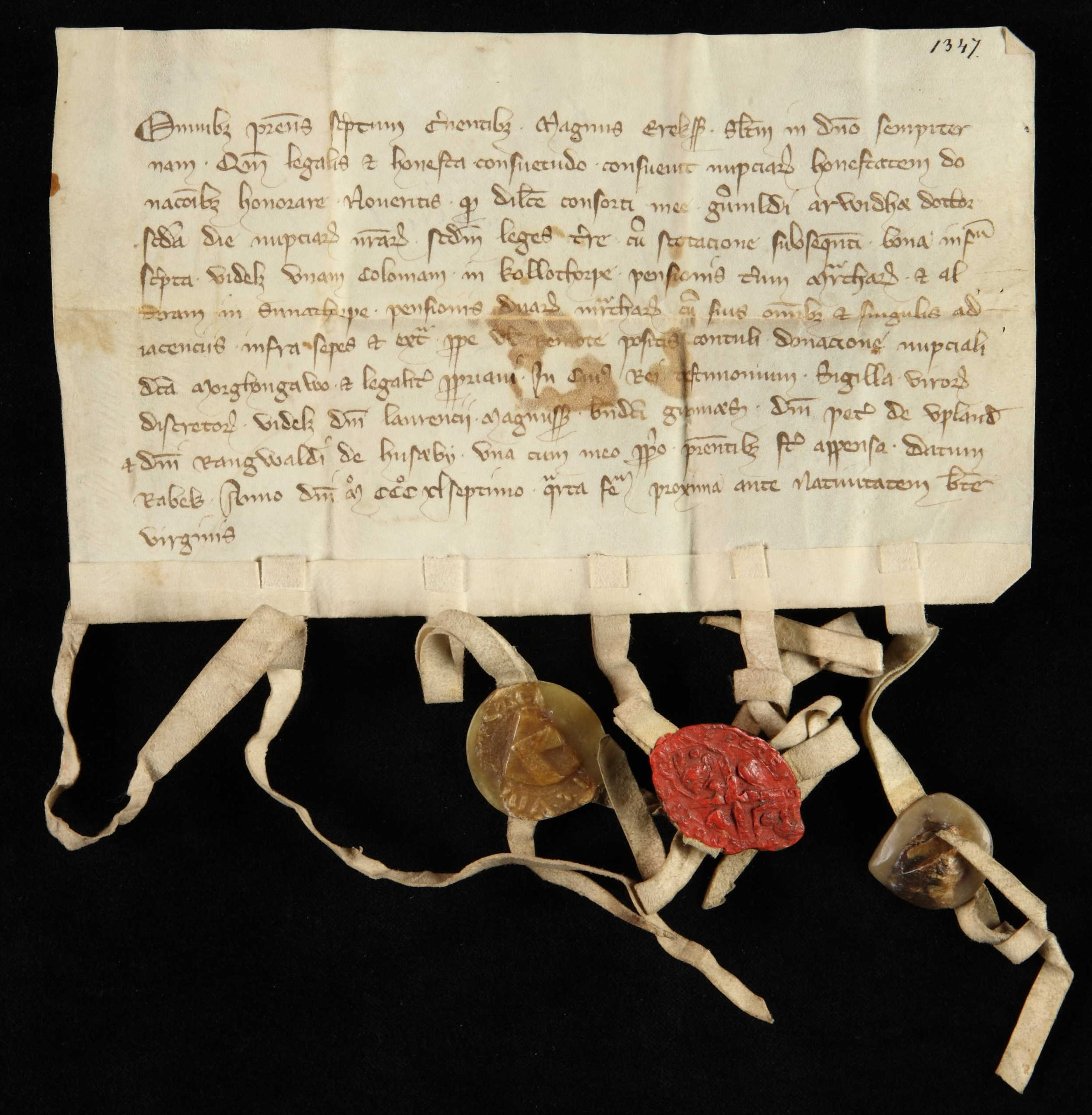
Deed for a dower from Magnus Eriksson to his new wife Gunhild Arvidsdotter

Dower was a property arrangement for marriage first used in early medieval German cultures, and the Catholic Church drove its adoption into other countries, in order to improve the wife's security by this additional benefit. The practice of dower was prevalent in those parts of Europe influenced by Germanic Scandinavian culture, such as Sweden, Germany, Normandy and successor states of the Langobardian kingdom.

The husband was legally prevented from using the wife's dower — as contrasted with her dowry, which was brought to the marriage by the bride and used by both spouses. This often meant that the woman's legal representative, usually a male relative, became guardian or executor of the dower, to ensure that it was not squandered.

Usually, the wife was free from kin limitations to use (and bequeath) her dower to whatever and whomever she pleased. It may have become the property of her next marriage, been given to an ecclesiastical institution, or been inherited by her children from other relationships than that from which she received it.

== Types ==
In English legal history, there were originally five kinds of dower:

1. Dower ad ostium ecclesiae, was the closest to modern meaning of dower. It was the property secured by law, in bride's name at the church porch (where marriages used to take place). This was optional. Dower was not the same as bride price; rather, it was legal assignment of movable or fixed property that became the bride's property.
2. Dower de la plus belle was a hereditary conveyance of tenure by knight service. It was abolished in 1660, by the act which did away with old tenures.
3. Dower ex assensu patris, was the dower given to the bride by the father of the bridegroom. This became obsolete long before it was formally abolished (in the United Kingdom, for example, by the Dower Act 1834).
4. At common law, dower was of a very different nature. It was a legal declaration of a wife's right to property, while the husband lived, which he would manage; which would transfer to the wife's children when they were born; and which would secure her livelihood were she widowed. A dower at common law was not liable for the husband's debts — which became controversial after many tried to use it to shield their property from the collection of debts. The Dower Acts of 19th century abolished this.
5. Dower by custom was an attempt to recognize the rules of dower customary at each manor and in each region. Customary dowers were also abolished in the 19th century, and replaced with uniform inheritance laws.

== History ==
=== Roman era ===
Dower is thought to have been suggested by the bride price which Tacitus found to be usual among the Germans. This bride price he terms dos, but contrasts it with the dos (dowry) of the Roman law, which was a gift on the part of the wife to the husband, while in Germany the gift was made by the husband to the wife. There was indeed in the Roman law what was termed donatio propter nuptias, a gift from the family of the husband, but this was only required if the dos were brought on the part of the wife. So too in the special instance of a widow (herself poor and undowried) of a husband rich at the time of his death, an ordinance of the Christian Emperor Justinian secured her the right to a part of her husband's property, of which no disposition of his could deprive her.

=== Establishment in Western Europe ===
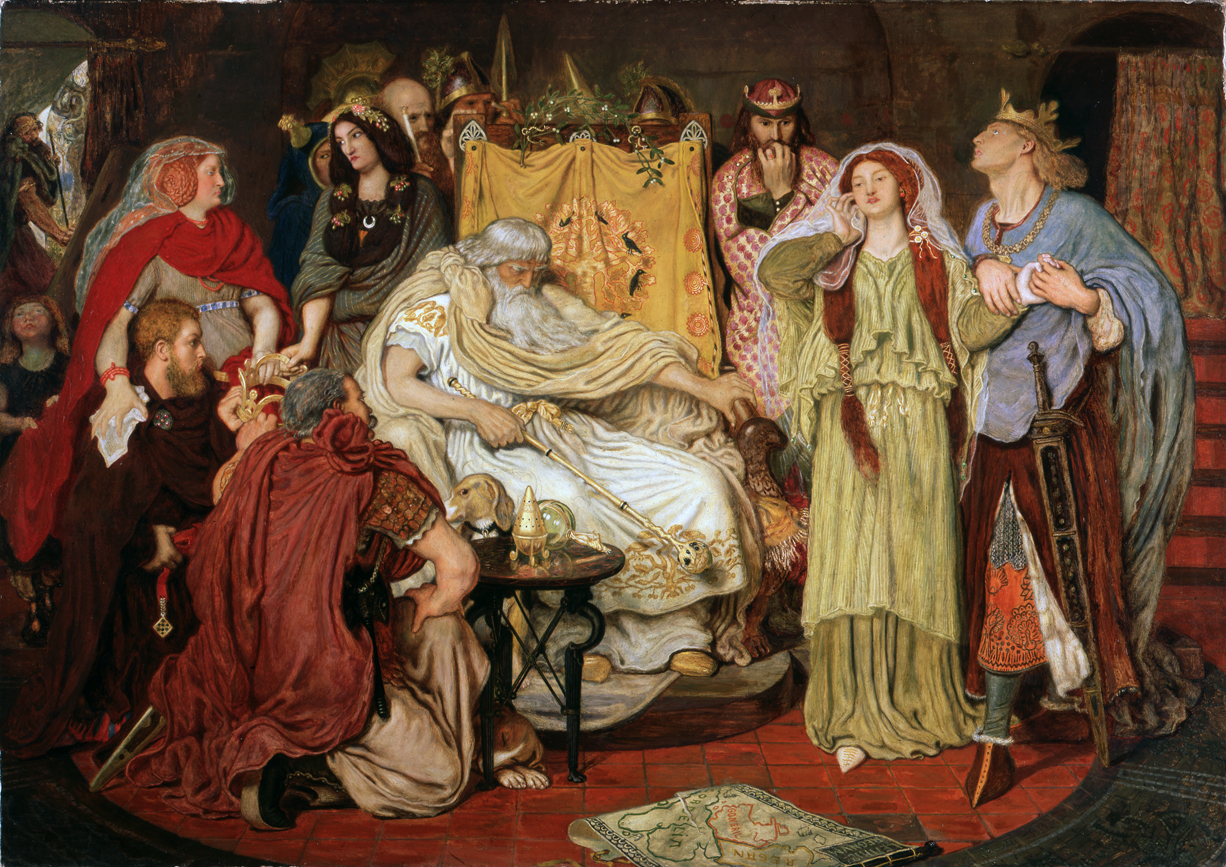
"Thy truth, then, be thy dower". King Lear

Dower payments evolved from the Germanic custom of paying a bride price, which over centuries morphed into the bride gift. After the introduction of Christianity, the custom of dower persisted as a method of exacting from the husband at marriage a promise to endow his wife, a promise retained in form even now in the marriage ritual of the Established Church in England. Dower is mentioned in an ordinance of King Philip Augustus of France (1214), and in the almost contemporaneous Magna Carta (1215); but it seems to have already become customary law in Normandy, Sicily, and Naples, as well as in England. The object of both ordinance and charter was to regulate the amount of the dower where this was not the subject of voluntary arrangement, dower by English law consisting of a wife's life estate in one-third of the lands of the husband "of which any issue which she might have had might by possibility have been heir".

=== England and other common law countries ===
There is judicial authority of the year 1310 for the proposition that dower was favoured by law, and at a less remote period it was said to be with life and liberty one of three things which "the law favoreth". In England in the late 18th century, it became common for men to hold land with a trust that prevented their wives' acquiring dower. Accordingly, the English statute, the Fines and Recoveries Act 1833 was passed to impair the inviolability of dower by empowering husbands to cut off by deed or will their wives from dower. Wives married before the Act still had (in certain cases) to acknowledge the deed before a commissioner to bar their right to dower in property which their husband sold. This was simpler than the previous procedure, which had required a fine to be levied in the Court of Common Pleas, a fictitious proceeding, by which she and her husband formally remitted their right to the property to the purchaser.

In English law, dower was one third of the lands seised in fee by the husband during the marriage. However, in the early modern period, it was common for a wife to bar her right to dower in advance under a marriage settlement, under which she agreed to take instead a jointure, that is a particular interest in her husband's property, either a particular share, or a life interest in a particular part of the land, or an annuity. This was often part of an arrangement by which she gave up her property to her husband in exchange for her jointure, which would accordingly be greater than a third. Strictly dower was only available from land that her husband owned, but a life tenant under a settlement was often given power to appoint a jointure for his wife. The wife would retain her right to dower (if not barred by a settlement) even if her husband sold the property; however this right could also be barred by a fictitious court proceeding known as levying a fine. The widow of a copyholder was usually provided for by the custom of the manor with freebench, an equivalent right to dower, but often (but not necessarily) a half, rather than a third.

=== Quebec ===
As of 1913, the law in Quebec recognized a customary dower for widows, a holdover from old French law. This dower could be forfeited by women who took perpetual vows in certain religious orders.

=== Scotland ===
Under Scots law, the part of the estate that cannot be denied to a surviving wife is referred to as jus relictae.

=== United States ===
It was the law of dower unimpaired by statute which, according to the American commentator Chancellor Kent, has been "with some modifications everywhere adopted as part of the municipal jurisprudence of the United States". In American law, a widow's dower estate has phases: inchoate dower while the husband is still alive (wives co-sign their husbands' deeds for land in order to release their inchoate dower rights), unassigned dower after his death and before a dower lot is assigned to her, assigned (and if necessary admeasured) dower once the lot is determined. Then she can live on the dower lot or get its usufruct ("fruits" like actual fruit or animals grown there, and any rental income from her share), during her life. She can sell her unassigned or assigned dower rights, but could not sell them while they were still inchoate before her husband's death. Her dower lot is assigned to her by the husband's heirs who inherit the land, and it should be one-third of the husband's real property (by value, not by land area). If the widow disputes it, she or the heirs may file an action in court for admeasurement of dower and the court will determine and assign a dower lot to the widow. See Scribner on Dower. A widow's dower and widower's curtesy rights have been abolished by statute in most American states and territories, most recently in Michigan in 2016. Dower was never "received" into Louisianan law, its civil code being based mainly on French law. In Arkansas, Kentucky, Ohio and the Territory of Palmyra Island, a widow's dower remains a valid estate in land—modified and augmented in Arkansas and Kentucky with other protections for surviving spouses like elective share and community property.

== Relationship to religious profession ==
During the pre-Reformation period, a man who became a monk and made his religious profession in England was deemed civilly dead, "dead in law"; consequently his heirs inherited his land forthwith as though he had died a natural death. Assignment of dower in his hand would nevertheless be postponed until the natural death of such a man, for only by his wife's consent could a married man be legally professed in religion, and she was not allowed by her consent to exchange her husband for dower. After the Reformation and the enactment of the English statute of 11 and 12 William III, prohibiting "papists" from inheriting or purchasing lands, a Roman Catholic widow was not held to be debarred of dower, for dower accruing by operation of law was deemed to be not within the prohibitions of the statute. By a curious disability of old English law a Jewish widow born in England would be debarred of dower in land which her husband, he having been an Englishman of the same faith and becoming converted after marriage, should purchase, if she herself remained unconverted.

== Morganatic marriage: a post-medieval application ==
Some high-born persons have been prone to marry an ineligible spouse. Particularly in European countries where the equal birth of spouses (Ebenbürtigkeit) was an important condition to marriages of dynasts of reigning houses and high nobility, the old matrimonial and contractual law provision of dowering was taken into a new use by institutionalizing the morganatic marriage. Marriage being morganatical prevents the passage of the husband's titles and privileges to the wife and any children born of the marriage.

Morganatic, from the Latin phrase matrimonium ad morganaticam, refers to the dower (Latin: morganaticum, German: Morgengabe, Swedish: morgongåva). When a marriage contract is made that the bride and the children of the marriage will not receive anything else (than the dower) from the bridegroom or from his inheritance or patrimony or from his clan, that sort of marriage was dubbed as "marriage with only the dower and no other inheritance", i.e. matrimonium ad morganaticum.

Neither the bride nor any children of the marriage has any right on the groom's titles, rights, or entailed property. The children are considered legitimate on other counts and the prohibition of bigamy applies.

The practice of "only-doweried" is close to pre-nuptial contracts excluding the spouse from property, though children are usually not affected by prenuptials, whereas they certainly were by morganatical marriage.

Morganatic marriage contained an agreement that the wife and the children born of the marriage will not receive anything further than what was agreed in pre-nuptials, and in some cases may have been zero, or something nominal. Separate nobility titles were given to morganatic wives of dynasts of reigning houses, but it sometimes included no true property. This sort of dower was far from the original purpose of the bride receiving a settled property from the bridegroom's clan, in order to ensure her livelihood in widowhood.

The practice of morganatic marriage was most common in historical German states, where equality of birth between the spouses was considered an important principle among the reigning houses and high nobility. Morganatic marriage has not been and is not possible in jurisdictions that do not allow sufficient freedom of contracting, as it is an agreement containing that pre-emptive limitation to the inheritance and property rights of the wife and the children. Marriages have never been considered morganatic in any part of the United Kingdom.

== In Islam ==
The payment from the groom to the bride is a mandatory condition for all valid Muslim marriages: a man must pay mahr to his bride. It is the duty of the husband to pay as stated in the Qu'ran (Sura Al-Nisaa’ verses 4 and 20–24), although often his family may assist, and by agreement can be in promissory form, i.e. in the event the husband pronounces talaq. It is considered a gift which the bride has to agree on. The mahr can be any value as long as it is agreed upon by both parties. When the groom gives his bride the mahr, it becomes her property. While the mahr is usually in the form of cash, it may also be real estate or a business.

The mahr is of assistance to a wife in times of financial need, such as a divorce or desertion by the husband. If the mahr is in promissory form then it becomes payable if the husband initiates a divorce. If it was previously paid, the wife is entitled to keep her mahr. However, if the woman initiates the divorce (in the procedure called khula), the circumstances of the breakup become relevant. If the divorce is sought for cause (such as abuse, illness, impotence, or infidelity), the woman is generally considered to have the right to keep the mahr; however, if the divorce is not sought for a generally accepted cause, the husband may request its return.

== In the Baháʼí Faith ==
According to the Kitáb-i-Aqdas, the Baháʼí Faith's most holy book, the dower is paid from the groom to the bride. The dower, if the husband lives in a city, is nineteen mithqáls (approx. 2.2 troy ounces) of pure gold, or, if the husband lives outside a city, the same amount in silver.

== See also ==
- Bride price
- Curtesy
- Elective Share
- Jointure
- Wittum
