= Gladman & Norman Ltd =

Manufacturing company

Gladman & Norman is a private limited company in the United Kingdom that is known for manufacturing awards and insignias.

== Company Background ==
The company was founded in 1910 by two friends, Alfred Gladman and Samuel Norman who met at the School of Jewellery in Birmingham.

Samuel Norman was an artist and designer, and taught for a time at Handsworth Art School. He used his skills to engrave dies for companies in the Jewellery Quarter, and the newly established Gladman & Norman undertook the stamping for these firms.

Norman died in 1919 from complications caused by his service in the First World War, and left his entire estate to Alfred Gladman. Laura and Grace Gladman helped Alfred to run the business and they continued running it after his death, also caused by complications from being gassed during the war, in 1932. The Gladmans sold the business to the Hadley family, who incorporated it as a limited company in 1936.

The company expanded its badge making and produced a vast range of commemorative items with town crests for most of the popular holiday resorts being a major part of the production. The business expanded, and by the time the Second World War broke out, it was producing cap badges for the Armed Forces. During the war years, badge production grew and ran alongside production of parts for aircraft and naval ships. At its peak, the company was producing over 300,000 badges for the government each year.

Following British government's shift to move to aluminium "stay-brite" badges, the company ceased production of Armed Forces cap badges to concentrate on badges for various organizations and events as well as medal and regalia production.

In 2004 the company was purchased by WM Holdings (UK) plc to become the production arm of the group. Under the new directors, the company moved into the production of state insignia and medals for governments around the world, including the United Kingdom, Malaysia, Jamaica, Canada, Jordan, Tonga, Bhutan, St Lucia and others.

Amongst other British medals, the company produces the Insignia of The Royal Red Cross 1st and 2nd Class (RRC) and (ARRC) and the Order of the British Empire 4th and 5th Class (OBE) and (MBE). The company also designed and produced The Elizabeth Cross.

In addition to orders, decorations, and medals, the company also produces a wide range of enamelled badges for car clubs, including MG and Morgan clubs; the Order of St John; state honors, fraternal society regalia; and regimental jewelry, including sweetheart brooches, cufflinks, and tie-pins.
