= Courtesy tenure =

Life interest that a widower can claim in land

Courtesy tenure (or curtesy/courtesy of England) is the legal term denoting the life interest which a widower (i.e. former husband) may claim in the lands of his deceased wife, under certain conditions. The tenure relates only to those lands of which his wife was in her lifetime actually seised (or sasined in Scots law) and not therefore to an estate of inheritance.

The customs and the meaning of the word has considerable doubt. It has been said to be a tenure peculiar to England and to Scotland, hence called the courtesy of England and the courtesy of Scotland, yet this is erroneous, for it is found also in Germany and France. The Mirroir des Justices ascribes its introduction to King Henry I (1100–1135). The historian K. E. Digby states it to be connected with curia, having reference either to the attendance of the husband as tenant of the lands at the lord's court, or to mean simply that the husband is acknowledged tenant by the courts of England.

The requisites necessary to create a tenancy by courtesy are:

- A legal marriage must have existed;
- The estate claimed in courtesy must have been an estate in possession of which the wife must have been actually seised; and,
- Issue must have existed born alive and during the mother's existence, though it is immaterial whether the issue subsequently live or die, or whether it is born before or after the wife's seisin.

In the case of lands held under gavelkind tenure the husband has a right to courtesy tenure whether there is issue born or not but the courtesy extends only to a moiety (i.e. half) of the wife's lands and ceases if the husband marries again. The issue must have been capable of inheriting as heir to the wife, so that if for example a wife were seised of lands in tail male the birth of a daughter would not entitle the husband to a tenancy by courtesy. The title to the tenancy vests only on the death of the wife.

The Married Women's Property Act 1882 did not affect the right of courtesy so far as relating to the wife's undisposed-of realty, and the Settled Land Act 1884, section 8, provided that for the purposes of the Settled Land Act 1882 the estate of a tenant by courtesy is to be deemed an estate arising under a settlement made by the wife.

In England and Wales, "Tenancy by the curtesy and every other estate and interest of a husband in real estate as to which his wife dies intestate, whether arising under the general law or by custom or otherwise" was abolished by section 45 of the Administration of Estates Act 1925. In modern law, tenancy by the curtesy no longer exists in England and Wales. The Administration of Estates Act 1925 abolished all curtesy rights arising on intestacy, and subsequent reforms have confirmed that surviving spouses inherit under a unified statutory scheme rather than by feudal tenure.

In Scotland, the historical estate of courtesy was abolished for all deaths occurring after the commencement of the Succession (Scotland) Act 1964. Later reforms under the Abolition of Feudal Tenure etc. (Scotland) Act 2000 removed the remaining feudal framework in which such rights originally operated, confirming that curtesy has no function in modern Scots succession law.

== See also ==
- Dower
- Elective share
- Jointure
- Land tenure
