= Brenn =

Brenn, a Scots word for burn (with fire), is both a surname and a given name. Notable people with the name include:

- Bruce Brenn (born 1935), American businessman
- Brenn Hill (born 1976), American singer-songwriter
- Malin Brenn (born 1999), Norwegian footballer
