= William Alexander Fraser (writer) =

Canadian oil prospector and author

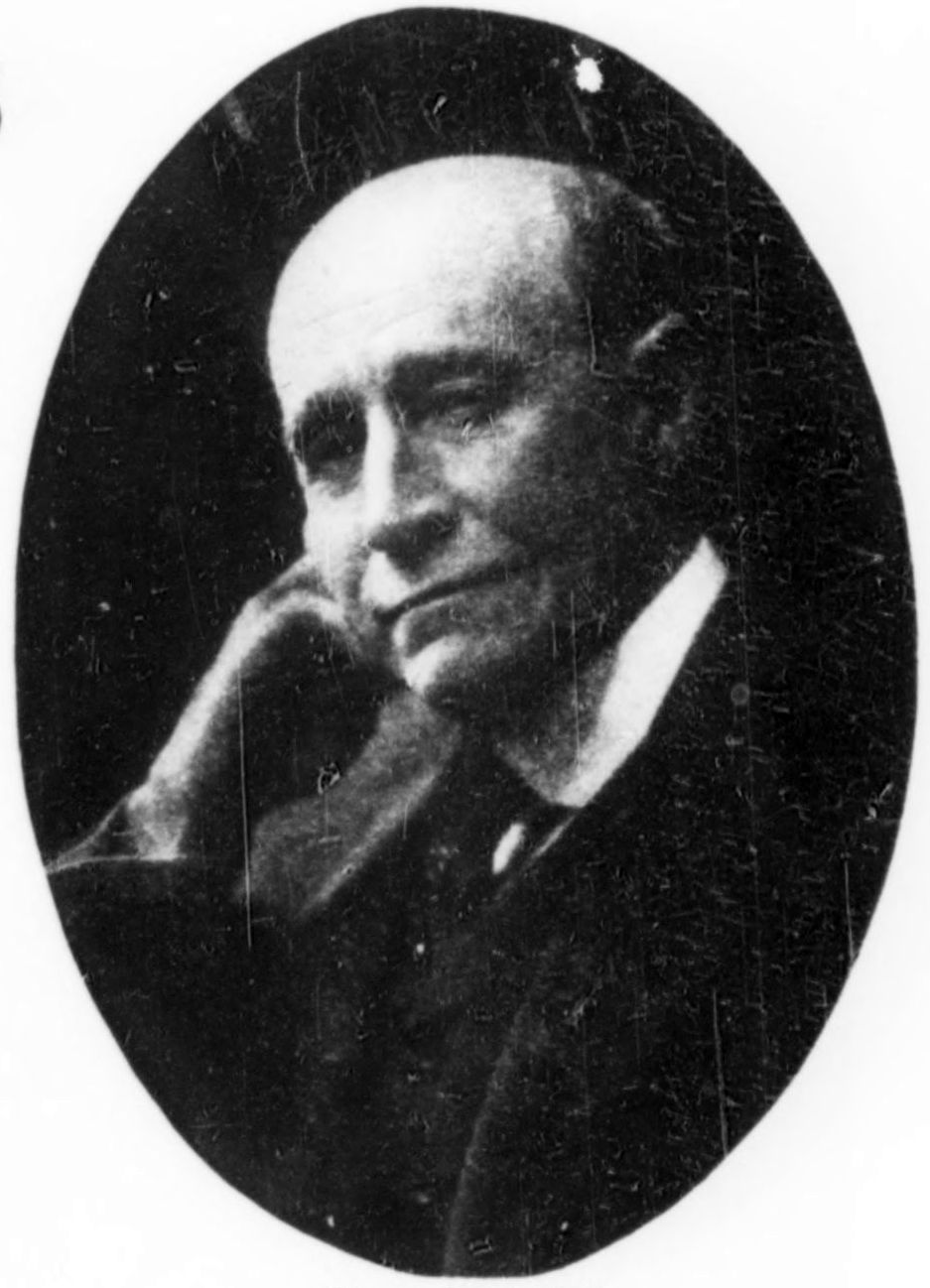
W A Fraser, 1918

William Alexander Fraser (24 March 1859 — 9 November 1933) was a Canadian writer.

Fraser was born at River John in Pictou County, Nova Scotia of Scots parents. William moved to the United States to study. Until the age of 14, he studied in New York City and Boston. Then he returned to Canada, where he began to live with his uncle in Elgin County in Southwestern Ontario. In Canada, Fraser became an engineer and was involved in the development of the first oil wells in Western Ontario. He also engaged in early petroleum prospecting in Alberta.

Then he went to Asia for 7 years to search for oil. William lived and worked in Burma and India. He met the writer Rudyard Kipling. They were friends for the rest of his life. In 1889 he married Jessie Maud Barber.

Returning to his homeland, Fraser spent 6 years searching for oil in Western Canada for the Canadian government. He sank the first well at Pelican Falls, Alberta.

Fraser later searched for precious metals in the Cobalt District of Northern Ontario. The illness forced Fraser to quit his job as a geologist.

He moved to Georgetown, where he lived for many years.

In the last years of his life, Fraser settled in Toronto, where he died in his residence in his seventy-fifth year.

Fraser is the author of 250 short stories. The short stories of Bulldog Carney are set in and around Edmonton, Alberta in the pre-WWI years.

One of his favorite topics was the description of animal life.

Fraser came up with the idea of introducing the Silver Cross for mothers whose sons had died in the First World War.

== Works ==
- The Eye of a God and Other Tales of East and West. New York: 1899, Doubleday & McClure
- Mooswa & Others of the Boundaries. New York: 1900, Charles Scribner's Sons
- The Outcasts. New York: 1901, Charles Scribner's Sons
- Thoroughbreds. Toronto: George N. Morang, 1902. Horse-racing mystery.
- The Blood Lilies. Toronto: Briggs, 1903.
- Brave Hearts. New York: Scribner's, 1904. Horse-racing mystery.
- The Sa'-zada tales. New York, C. Scribner's sons, 1905
- Thirteen Men. New York: Appleton, 1906.
- The Lone Furrow. New York: D. Appleton and Company, 1907.
- The Three Sapphires. Toronto: McClelland, Goodchild & Stewart, 1918.
- Bulldog Carney. Toronto: McClelland fit Stewart. 1919.
- Red Meekins. Toronto: McClelland & Stewart. 1921. Set in the Cobalt District oí Northern Ontario.
- Caste. Toronto: Doran. 1922.
- Delihah Plays the Ponies. Toronto: Musson, 1927. Horse-racing mystery.
- Sorrow and Old Friends. Philadelphia: H. Altemus, 1987.
