= Worcestershire Medal Service =

Worcestershire Medal Service, Ltd., established in 1988, is a manufacturer of State honours and insignia. Working with the Ministry of Defence to assist in the licensing of the production of medals, they became the first company to be granted such a licence in 2004. They were granted a Royal Warrant as Medallists to Elizabeth II in 2008.

On 1 December 2011, the UK Government announced that they had awarded the contract to manufacture the Queen Elizabeth II Diamond Jubilee Medal to the company. They producing around 450,000 medals.

Today they are the approved manufacturers of all insignia issued by St James's Palace, which includes the George Cross, George Medal and the Queen's Gallantry Medal. In May 2018, the company was awarded the contract to manufacture all medals issued by the UK Ministry of Defence, including all Military Gallantry, Campaign and Long and Meritorious Service Medals – an historic move away from the Royal Mint, which had manufactured these awards for over 200 years. This includes all gallantry awards to HM Armed Forces: the Conspicuous Gallantry Cross, Distinguished Service Cross, Military Cross, Distinguished Flying Cross and Air Force Cross. The company also produced the 2022 jubilee and 2023 coronation medals, and produces the Elizabeth Cross.

As well as providing insignia to governments around the world, they also provide the largest selection of UK miniature and replacement medals.

== See also ==
- Elizabeth Cross
