= Matthew Brend =

Sir Matthew Brend
- Born: 6 February 1600
- Died: 1659 (aged 58–59); London
- Spouse: Frances Smith
- Children: Thomas Brend; Francis Brend
- Parent(s): Nicholas Brend, Margaret Strelley

Sir Matthew Brend (6 February 1600 – 1659) inherited from his father, Nicholas Brend, the land on which the first and second Globe Theatres were built, and which Nicholas Brend had leased on 21 February 1599 for a 31-year term to Cuthbert Burbage, Richard Burbage, William Shakespeare, Augustine Phillips, Thomas Pope, John Heminges, and William Kempe. During much of the time he was the legal owner of the Globe, Matthew Brend was underage, and his properties were managed for him by Sir Matthew Browne, John Collet, Sir John Bodley, and Sir Sigismund Zinzan. In 1623 Brend conveyed the property on which the Globe was built to his wife, Frances, as part of her jointure. In 1632 he was sued in the Court of Requests by the remaining original lessee, Cuthbert Burbage, and others, for an extension of their original lease.

== Family ==
Matthew Brend, born 6 February 1600 and baptized 6 March 1600 in the parish church of St Mary Aldermanbury, London, was the elder son of Nicholas Brend of West Molesey and Margaret Strelley. He had a younger brother, John, and three sisters, Jane (born c.1595), Mercy (born 1597), and Frances (born 1598).

== Career ==
Shortly after his own father's death, Nicholas Brend had leased part of his father's Southwark property for 31 years at a yearly rent of £14 10s to Cuthbert Burbage, Richard Burbage, William Shakespeare, Augustine Phillips, Thomas Pope, John Heminges, and William Kempe. The lease agreement took effect at Christmas 1598, although it was not signed until 21 February 1599, and ran until 25 December 1629.

Nicholas Brend survived his father by only three years. He died on 12 October 1601, leaving an estate encumbered by debts which he estimated at £1478. In order to provide for his wife and five children, including his infant son and heir, Matthew, in his final days Nicholas Brend entered into legal agreements with his half brother, John Bodley of Streatham, his uncle, John Collet, and his friend, Sir Matthew Browne of Betchworth Castle, Surrey, under which Collet and Browne would act as his trustees, and under which Bodley would pay Brend's debts, taking in return a mortgage on Brend's properties in Bread Street and Southwark, including the Globe Theatre. In addition Collet would give Brend £250 in cash, and Collet and Browne would take mortgages on the properties in Bread Street and Southwark for £1478. Brend also signed a bond on 8 October under which he promised to pay Collet and Browne £2500 if he did not perform the requirements of the mortgage. In his will, which he drew up on 10 October, Brend authorized Bodley and Browne to sell certain of his properties, including his house at St. Peter's Hill, London.

This was the complicated financial situation inherited by Nicholas Brend's infant son, Matthew Brend.

One of Nicholas Brend's overseers and trustees, Sir Matthew Browne, died within two years; he and Sir John Townshend were both killed in a duel on horseback in 1603.

In about 1605 Matthew Brend's mother, Margaret, remarried. Her second husband was Sir Sigismund Zinzan alias Alexander, one of Queen Elizabeth's equerries, and the son of Sir Robert Zinzan (c.1547–1607). Margaret brought Sir Sigismund Zinzan a marriage portion of over £1000, which Berry suggests would have been 'raised out of Brend properties'. By Zinzan Margaret had four sons and three daughters, Matthew Brend's stepbrothers and sisters:

- Henry Zinzan, who married Jacoba, one of the daughters of Sir Peter Vanlore of Tilehurst, Berkshire.
- Sigismund Zinzan.
- Robert Zinzan.
- Charles Zinzan, who married firstly Elizabeth Plume of Essex, secondly Elizabeth Stanton, and thirdly a daughter of one Hogg of Scotland, 'where he lives'.
- John Zinzan.
- Margaret Zinzan.
- Elizabeth Zinzan.
- Letitia Zinzan.

In 1608 John Collet, Nicholas Brend's remaining trustee, transferred his interest in the Globe and the other properties to John Bodley, who collected the rents and 'effectively owned the Globe' until Matthew Brend came of age on 6 February 1621.

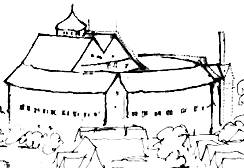
Sketch by Wenceslas Hollar of second Globe Theatre

In June 1613 the first Globe Theatre burned to the ground. According to the terms of the lease, the lessees were required to rebuild, but before they undertook the considerable expense of rebuilding, Cuthbert Burbage, Richard Burbage, John Heminges and Henry Condell of the King's Men put their case to the then effective owner of the property, John Bodley, and on 26 October 1613 Bodley granted the lessees a 6-year extension of the lease, an extension which was later ratified by the Court of Wards.

Since Bodley had refused to grant them an extension for longer than six years, the Burbage brothers, Condell, Heminges, and Heminges' son-in-law, John Atkins, a London scrivener, went in February 1614 to West Molesey where the legal owner of the property, Matthew Brend, was then living with his mother and her second husband, Sir Sigismund Zinzan. Since he was underage, Brend could not sign a legally binding contract, and the lessees accordingly proposed that he sign a document stating that when he came of age, in return for a payment of £10 he would ratify a 15-year extension of their lease to run from 25 December 1629. Brend signed the document, and his signature was witnessed by his mother, Margaret Zinzan, his uncle, Henry Strelley, and John Atkins.

Upon reaching his majority, Matthew Brend promptly sued Sir John Bodley, in the Court of Wards in 1622 for the return of his properties, including the Globe, and although Bodley took the position that the document signed by Nicholas Brend on 10 October 1601 had been an absolute sale, the Court ruled against him, and stipulated that the properties should be returned to Matthew Brend upon payment by him of £750 to Bodley as recompense for money owed to Bodley by Nicholas Brend and for Bodley's superintendence of the properties since Nicholas Brend's death. In the winter of 1622-3 Sir Matthew Brend sued Bodley again, this time joined in the suit by his brother and three sisters, alleging that Bodley had enriched himself at their expense during their minorities.

During the time Sir Matthew Brend was underage, his mother, Margaret, had not received the one-third of the income from Nicholas Brend's lands to which she was entitled, and in the summer of 1623 her second husband, Sir Sigismund Zinzan, and her son, Sir Matthew Brend, agreed upon terms for payment to Margaret of the sums owing to her. However this settlement was almost immediately revised in September of that year when Sir Matthew Brend was required to provide a jointure for his bride to be, Frances Smith. A new agreement was then reached under which Brend granted his mother a life estate in his properties in Southwark, including the land on which the Globe Theatre was built, and the property was conveyed to Frances Smith as part of her jointure, with her interest to take effect after Margaret's death. In the late fall of 1624, pursuant to this agreement, Sir Sigismund Zinzan became effective owner of the Globe in right of his wife, Margaret, and continued to be so for a period of more than two years, despite lawsuits filed against him in Chancery by Sir Matthew Brend. According to Berry, Zinzan and Brend eventually negotiated a settlement, and in any event Zinzan's interest in the Globe in right of his wife came to an end when Margaret Zinzan died at some time prior to 20 June 1627. After the termination of Margaret Zinzan's life estate, the new owner of the Globe was Sir Matthew Brend's wife, Frances.

There were other frictions between Brend and his stepfather. In 1624-5 Brend alleged that Zinzan had harvested valuable timber on the family estate in West Molesey during the nineteen-year period during which Zinzan had been 'master' there. Zinzan denied the charge, claiming he had taken only a few pollarded trees to repair buildings on the property, and for use as palings for fences.

After reaching the age of majority in 1621, Brend had never confirmed the 15-year extension of the lease granted by him to the Burbage brothers, Heminges and Condell in February 1614, while he was still a minor, and in about 1631, when the original lease had expired and the 6-year extension granted to them by John Bodley on 26 October 1613 had only four years still to run, the remaining lessees again requested Brend to ratify the document he had signed in February 1614. Brend refused, however, claiming that the property would have yielded him more revenue had houses been erected upon it, rather than a theatre.

Faced with the possibility of dispossession from the Globe, on 28 January 1632, through their lawyer, Richard Lane, the remaining original lessee, Cuthbert Burbage, and the representatives of the other original lessees, who at the time were Richard Robinson and Winifred Robinson (d.1642), his wife, William Heminges, John Lowin and Joseph Taylor, filed a bill of complaint against Brend in the Court of Requests.

In the midst of this lawsuit, in June 1633 Sir Matthew Brend augmented his wife Frances' jointure so that she became owner of the properties comprised in it, including the Globe, not merely for life, but forever. This had no apparent effect on the lawsuit, despite the fact that Dame Frances had earlier conveyed the property to two of her brothers in trust, and in June 1633 conveyed it to John Kingsnorth, gentleman. As Berry points out, it was Sir Matthew Brend who managed the property, and it was his alleged agreement to an extension in February 1614 which was the nub of the lawsuit. The legal owner of the property, Dame Frances Brend, is nowhere mentioned in the court documents.

The lawsuit was finally settled in court on 18 November 1634 by an agreement between the parties stipulating that Sir Matthew Brend would draw up a new lease granting an extension of nine years to run from 25 December 1635, and that the lessees would pay an increased rent of £40 per year and would guarantee to leave the Globe in good repair at the end of that term. However Brend did not draw up a new lease, and on 25 December 1635 the original lease and the 6-year extension granted by Bodley expired. The lessees offered Brend the old rent, but he refused to accept it, and as a result received no rent for the next two years although the lessees were still in possession of the Globe. In mid-1637 Brend finally drew up a new lease, to run for nine years from 25 December 1635, but the lessees refused to accept it, stipulating that the new lease and the new rent of £40 per year payable under it should now only run from 25 December 1637. Brend went back to court, and obtained an order mandating that the lessees accept the new lease. The lessees then sought another court hearing, and obtained an order requiring them to pay the new rent for only one of the two years in contention, and that the new lease was now to run for eight years from 25 December 1636. Although no record that the new lease was finally signed survives, the lessees appear to have been secure in their possession of the Globe until 25 December 1644. However, before that date the English Civil War intervened, and in 1642 the playhouses were closed, rendering the final two years of the new lease moot.

It has been claimed, on the basis of a document at the Folger Shakespeare Library, that immediately upon the expiration of the lease on Lady Day 1644, i.e. 25 March 1644, Sir Matthew Brend took possession of the Globe and had it pulled down. However, as Berry points out, the extant documents state that the lease was to expire on 25 December 1644, not on Lady Day, and the document which claims that Brend had the Globe pulled down is now suspected to be a forgery.

== Marriage and issue ==
In the winter of 1623-4 Brend married Frances Smith, the daughter of Sir William Smith (d. 12 December 1626) of Theydon Mount, Essex, heir of Sir Thomas Smith, by whom he had two sons, Thomas and Francis.

About 1655, Sir Matthew Browne's elder son, Thomas, married Judith Smith, the daughter of Robert Smith, by whom he had two daughters, Frances and Elizabeth.
