= Personal property =

Property which can be moved from one location to another

Personal property is property that is movable. In common law systems, personal property may also be called chattels or personalty. In civil law systems, personal property is often called movable property or movables—any property that can be moved from one location to another.

Personal property can be understood in comparison to real estate, immovable property or real property (such as land and buildings). Movable property on land (larger livestock, for example) was not automatically sold with the land; it was "personal" to the owner and moved with the owner.

The word cattle is the Old Norman variant of Old French chatel, chattel (derived from Latin capitalis, "of the head"), which was once synonymous with general movable personal property.

== Classifications ==
Personal property may be classified in a variety of ways.

=== Intangible ===
Intangible personal property or "intangibles" refers to personal property that cannot actually be moved, touched or felt, but instead represents something of value such as negotiable instruments, securities, service (economics), and intangible assets including chose in action.

=== Tangible ===
Tangible personal property refers to any type of property that can generally be moved (i.e., it is not attached to real property or land), touched or felt. These generally include items such as furniture, clothing, jewelry, sunglasses, eyeglasses, art, writings, or household goods. In some cases, there can be formal title documents that show the ownership and transfer rights of that property after a person's death (for example, motor vehicles, boats, etc.) In many cases, however, tangible personal property will not be "titled" in an owner's name and is presumed to be whatever property he or she was in possession of at the time of his or her death.

=== Other distinctions ===
Accountants distinguish personal property from real property because personal property can be depreciated faster than improvements (while land is not depreciable at all). It is an owner's right to get tax benefits for chattel, and there are businesses that specialize in appraising personal property, or chattel.

The distinction between these types of property is significant for a variety of reasons. Usually, one's rights on movables are more attenuated than one's rights on immovables (or real property). The statutes of limitations or prescriptive periods are usually shorter when dealing with personal or movable property. Real property rights are usually enforceable for a much longer period of time and in most jurisdictions real estate and immovables are registered in government-sanctioned land registers. In some jurisdictions, rights (such as a lien or other security interest) can be registered against personal or movable property.

In common law, it is possible to place a mortgage upon real property. Such a mortgage requires payment, or the owner of the mortgage can seek foreclosure. Personal property can often be secured with a similar kind of device, variously called a chattel mortgage, a trust receipt, or a security interest. In the United States, Article 9 of the Uniform Commercial Code governs the creation and enforcement of security interests in most (but not all) types of personal property.

There is no similar institution to the mortgage in the civil law, however a hypothec is a device to secure real rights against property. These real rights follow the property along with the ownership. In common law a lien also remains on the property, and it is not extinguished by alienation of the property; liens may be real or equitable.

Many jurisdictions levy a personal property tax, an annual tax on the privilege of owning or possessing personal property within the boundaries of the jurisdiction. Automobile and boat registration fees are a subset of this tax. Most household goods are exempt as long as they are kept or used within the household.

The distinction between tangible and intangible personal property is also significant in some of the jurisdictions which impose sales taxes. In Canada, for example, provincial and federal sales taxes were imposed primarily on sales of tangible personal property whereas sales of intangibles tended to be exempt. The move to value added taxes, under which almost all transactions are taxable, has diminished the significance of the distinction.

== Personal vis-à-vis private property ==
- Marxists argue that private property is a social relationship between the owner and persons deprived, i.e., not a relationship between person and thing. Private property may include artifacts, factories, mines, dams, infrastructure, natural vegetation, mountains, deserts, and seas—these generate capital for the owner without the owner necessarily having to perform any physical labor. Conversely, those who perform labor using somebody else's private property are considered deprived of the value of their work in Marxist theory. Instead, they are given a salary that is disjointed from the value generated by the worker.
- Personal property, or possessions, includes "items intended for personal use" (e.g., one's toothbrush, clothes, and vehicles, and rarely, money). The owner has a distributive right to exclude others (i.e., the right to command a "fair share" of personal property).
- In anarchist theory, private property typically refers to capital or the means of production, whereas personal property refers to consumer and non-capital goods and services.

== See also ==
- Chattel house
- Communal property
- Jus relictae
- Secured transaction
- State property
- Trespass to chattels
