= Bruce Brenn =

American businessman (1935–2022)

Bruce Malcolm Brenn (September 13, 1935 – February 26 2022) was an American businessman, honored by the government of Japan for having "contributed to the promotion of education for the study of Japan, the deepening of understanding between Japan and the United States and the development of the sporting world in Japan."

== Early life ==
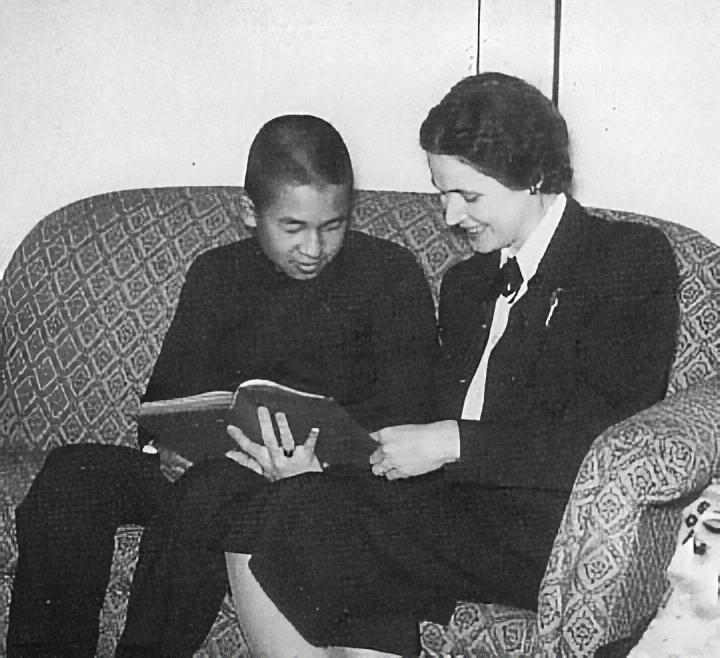
Crown Prince Akihito with his English tutor, Elizabeth Gray Vining, in 1949

As a 14-year-old boy in Tokyo at the end of the Second World War, he was one of four Western teen-aged boys who helped Japan's Crown Prince Akihito practice English conversation.

Although he was born in Idaho, Brenn went to college at the University of Oregon in Eugene, Oregon. In 1958, he was part of the Oregon football team that went to the Rose Bowl.

== Career ==
Brenn was Vice Chairman and Chief Executive Officer of Nike in Japan. The Nike corporate headquarters are located in Beaverton, Oregon; and even though he lived many years in Japan, working with Nike also served to enhance his sense of connection to the state of Oregon where he would later live in retirement.

Earlier in his career, he was a Citibank vice president in Tokyo.

== Portland activist ==
Brenn helped develop a Japanese-language program in the Portland public schools that evolved into the immersion program at Richmond Elementary School.

As Chairman of the Center for Japanese Studies Advisory Board, Brenn actively supported the growth of the Center for Japanese Studies at Portland State University.

== Death ==
Brenn died on February 26, 2022, at the age of 86.

== Honors ==
- Order of the Rising Sun, Gold Rays with Rosette, 2009.
