= Military history of Newfoundland during World War II =

When the Second World War broke out, Newfoundland was a dominion governed directly by the United Kingdom via the Commission of Government. As Newfoundland was administered by the Commission of Government and had no functioning parliament, the British declaration of war on Germany on 3 September 1939 automatically brought Newfoundland into a state of war with Germany.

In early 1941, United States Armed Forces were deployed to Newfoundland.

== Raising of the Newfoundland Militia ==
The period between the two world wars saw great political turmoil in the dominion of Newfoundland, resulting in the suspension of responsible government and the appointing of the Commission of Government, which led to Newfoundland reverting to de facto Crown colony status. The presence of the German Navy in Atlantic waters threatened the security of the country, and in September 1939 it was decided to raise a local defence militia unit for the defence of the island. The Newfoundland Militia was tasked with guarding strategic positions on the island, including the dry docks, water supply, and oil reserves in St. John's and the Newfoundland Broadcasting Company's radio station in Mount Pearl. Later, these guard duties were expanded to include the maintenance of a coastal defence battery on Bell Island to protect the Wabana Iron Ore Mines, and mines and docks throughout the rest of the island. Following the Fall of France in 1940, Newfoundland's defensive position was seen as being more precarious. This led to Canada assuming responsibility for the defence of Newfoundland with the establishment of "W Force": various infantry, artillery, and anti-aircraft garrison forces to be stationed on the island. The Newfoundland Militia was immediately placed under command of W Force and, eventually, under command of a Canadian commanding officer.

In addition to its infantry defence duties, Newfoundland also maintained the 1st Coastal Defence Battery, a coastal defence battery on Bell Island to protect the approaches to the island where bulk carriers loaded iron ore from the Bell Island Mines. On the night of September 4, 1942 German submarine U-513 entered Conception Bay and sunk SS Saganaga and SS Lord Strathcona. Responding to naval ships firing their guns at a target in the water, the 1st Coastal Defence Battery manned their guns and attempted to fire on the same location; however, the U-boat escaped. This was the only occasion that 1st Coastal Defence Battery fired its guns in action.

== Newfoundland Regiment ==
The efforts of the Canadian Army to expand and train the militia to professional standards resulted in the Newfoundland Militia being re-designated the Newfoundland Regiment on March 2, 1943. The regiment stayed in a home-defence role, but in addition to these duties was also tasked with training excess recruits for the two regiments of the Royal Artillery that were recruited in Newfoundland for overseas service. By the end of the Second World War, 1,668 Newfoundlanders had enlisted for service in the Newfoundland Regiment. 17 members of the militia were killed on December 12, 1942 during the Knights of Columbus Hostel fire in St. John's.

== Royal Artillery Service ==
Beginning in 1940, Newfoundland began recruiting citizens for service in two Royal Artillery units: the 57th (Newfoundland) Heavy Artillery Regiment and the 59th (Newfoundland) Heavy Artillery Regiment, though during the war, the 57th transitioned into a field artillery regiment and was redesignated the 166th (Newfoundland) Field Artillery Regiment. Both artillery units were initially assigned to coastal defence duties in Britain, resulting in a backlog of recruits in Newfoundland who could not be immediately posted to either artillery unit. To make use of these excess recruits, the Department of Militia decided in 1942 to utilize the artillery regiments as a training and recruit depot for artillery recruits. These individuals enlisted into the artillery regiments and were deployed overseas as they were needed. By the end of the war, 820 of the 1,668 members had deployed overseas with the Royal Artillery (representing roughly 20% of Newfoundland's artillery commitments), while a further 447 trained gunners were in Newfoundland awaiting transport to Europe on VE Day. Counting the men still in Newfoundland, 1,267 Newfoundland soldiers were assigned to the Royal Artillery during the Second World War.

=== 166th (Newfoundland) Field Artillery Regiment ===
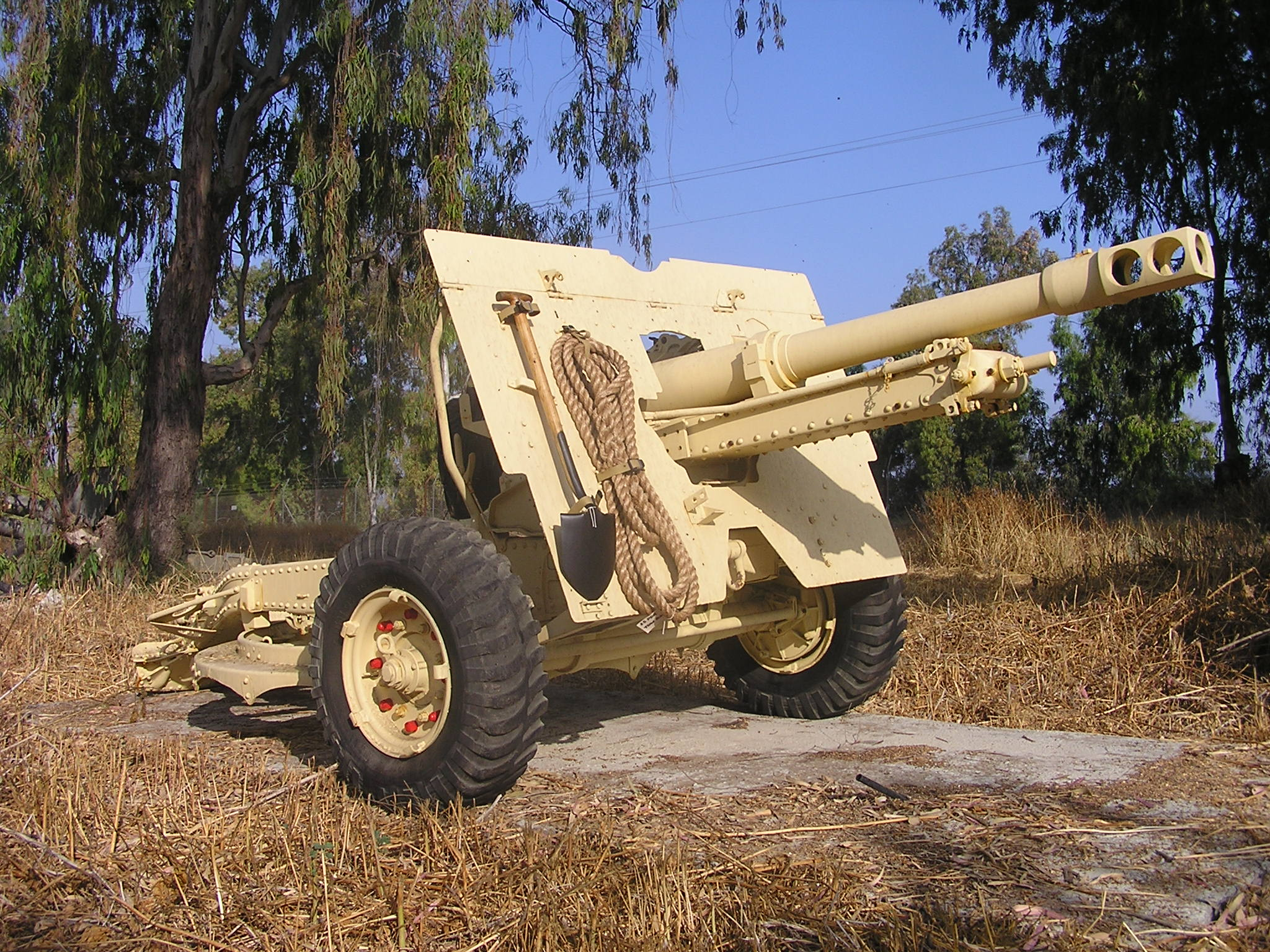
A British 25 pdr Gun, which the 166th (Newfoundland) Field Artillery Regiment used.

The 166th Regiment was first deployed to North Africa as part of the British First Army in the closing months of the North African Campaign. The regiment served in Tunisia until the end of the campaign, suffering 24 members killed in action. In Tunisia, the 166th supported soldiers of the French XIX Corps, specifically the Goumiers. The regiment remained in North Africa during the invasion of Sicily, not deploying to the island until the end of the campaign. The Newfoundlanders deployed to Italy in October 1943 with the British Eighth Army, where it remained until the end of hostilities in 1945. The regiment rotated between various divisions within the Eighth Army, including the 8th Indian Division and the 2nd New Zealand Division; the New Zealanders were under the command of Bernard Freyberg who had commanded the 88th Brigade in which the Royal Newfoundland Regiment served during the First World War. During the campaign, the 166th participated in major actions such as the Battle of Monte Cassino, and numerous soldiers of the regiment received decorations for bravery. One such individual was Captain Gordon Campbell (Cam) Eaton, who was awarded the Military Cross in 1943 while serving as a forward observation officer. Eaton went on to serve in the Canadian Forces after 1949 with the reformed 166th Regiment, R.C.A., and was appointed Honorary Colonel of the Royal Newfoundland Regiment and later received the Order of Canada.

=== 59th (Newfoundland) Heavy Artillery Regiment ===
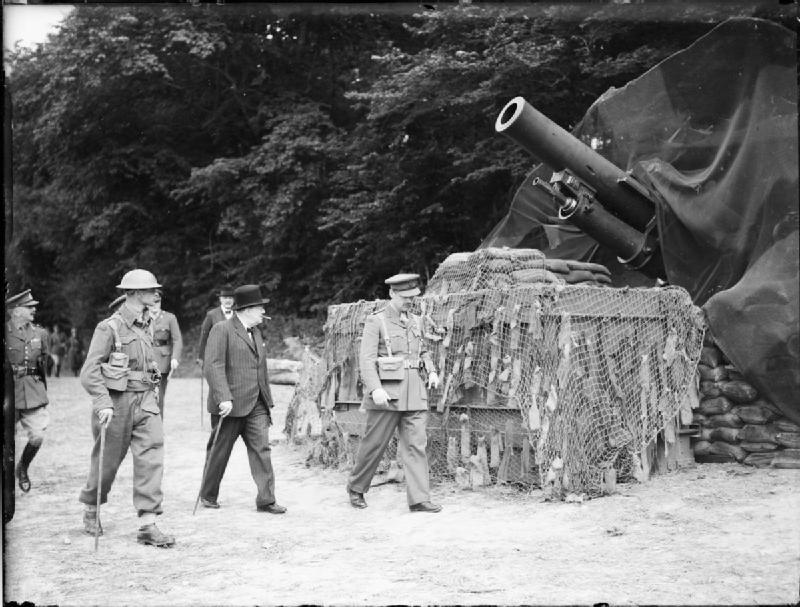
BL 9.2 inch Mk II howitzers of 57th (Newfoundland) Heavy Regiment, Royal Artillery being inspected by Sir Winston Churchill

As a heavy artillery regiment, the 59th remained in England on coastal defence duties until 1944. In July, following the Normandy landings, the 59th crossed the English Channel and on July 6 disembarked at Courseulles-sur-Mer where the 3rd Canadian Infantry Division had landed a month before. Once in France, the 59th served as part of the Army Group Royal Artillery of the British 21st Army Group. The unit first went into action supporting Battle for Caen, and later bombarded German forces in the Falaise Pocket. From there, the 59th participated in the major battles of the Western Front, including supporting the advance of XXX Corps during Operation Market Garden and in support of American forces during the Battle of the Bulge. The 59th ended the war in Germany, firing its last shots against Hamburg on May 2, 1945. During the North-West Europe campaign, the main guns of the 59th were the 7.2" Howitzer and the American-made 155mm "Long Tom".

== See also ==
- British Empire in World War II
- Canada in World War II
