= Jus relictae =

In Scots law, jus relictae is the right of the surviving spouse in the moveable property of the deceased spouse. Jus relictae is the term used for a surviving wife, and jus relicti is the term used for a surviving husband. The similar right for any surviving children is referred to as legitim.

The deceased must have been domiciled in Scotland, but the right accrues from moveable property, wherever situated. The surviving spouse's right vests by survivance, and is independent of the deceased spouse's testamentary provisions; it may however be renounced by contract, or be discharged by satisfaction. It is subject to alienation of the deceased spouse's moveable property during his lifetime or by its conversion into heritable property.

== Additional explanations ==
Prior to 1964 the surviving spouse also has a right of terce (not the same as the religious term terce) on the deceased spouse's lands. Thus, under Scots law, both moveable and heritable property were subject to the rights of a surviving spouse and children. However, section 10(1) of the Succession (Scotland) Act 1964 abolished the common law rights of 'terce' and 'courtesy'. Only jus relictae, jus relicti and legitim remain.

The legal principles of jus relictae and legitime also remain active in the US state of Louisiana, which differs from the other 49 states as it operates under a civil law code similar to the Napoleonic code and Roman law rather than common law.
