= Jointure =

Historical British legal concept

Jointure was a legal concept used largely in late mediaeval and early modern Britain, denoting the estate given to a married couple by the husband's family. One of its most important functions was providing a livelihood for the wife if she became widowed, and it is most often used in this sense, interchangeably with dower.

== In practice ==
After marriage, the father of the husband would settle lands or income on the couple to enable them to lead an economically independent life. This usually took the form of a settlement by deed, giving the couple joint tenancy for the duration of their lives (ensuring that the wife would keep all of the property upon being widowed). The eldest son and his wife, who would inherit the whole family estate on his father's death, received their jointure for the father's lifetime, while younger sons retained their jointure lands after their father died. The lands thus given to younger sons were either inherited by their descendants or reabsorbed into the family estate. Jointures were often given 'in survivorship', meaning that the wife would retain it if she survived the husband. In this case, the couple's jointure would form part or whole of the wife's promised dower. It is in this sense that the word is most often used.

Customarily, the jointure the head of a family allotted to his son and daughter-in-law in survivorship was proportionate to the dowry the wife brought into the marriage. The amount the couple received reflected the relative social status and economic power of the families of bride and groom. For example, if a wealthy commoner married a woman from a poorer noble family, she would be given a larger jointure in compensation for the elevated status she brought to her husband's family.

After marriage, a wife could bar her right to dower by a fine being levied. This meant that in practice, jointures could also be created by a post-nuptial settlement, provided the wife was willing. Wives (or their relatives on their behalf) often paid their husband a lump sum (known as a portion) or otherwise handed over her property to him, in exchange for a jointure (usually being more than a third) being settled on her for life. This might (in practice) be in the form of a share of the whole property or the right to a particular part of it or an annuity from it. In practical terms, over the course of the 18th century it became fairly common for a widow's portion of an estate to be based on a fixed percentage of the money she brought to the marriage, with an annuity of ten percent being normative. Thus, if a wife came to a marriage with a settlement of £5,000, she would be entitled to an income of £500 per annum for life or until she remarried. A legal contract for jointure was generally seen as more advantageous to the groom's family as otherwise the wife might be entitled to claim the income from up to a third of her husband's estate should he predecease her. Jointure agreements however carried their own risks, such as in the event of a long widowhood. Women who outlived their husbands by many years, sometimes decades, could put the estate under financial strain with the legal obligation to pay the annual annuity. Remarriage generally ended a jointure as the wife became the financial responsibility of her new husband and his family.

=== Legal jointure ===
The 1536 Statute of Uses introduced the concept of legal jointures into English law. The requirements for legal jointure were (1) that it 'must take effect immediately' when the husband died, (2) that it must be for the wife's lifetime or be terminable by her, (3) that it must be made before marriage takes place (if it was made after, the wife could choose to void it after being widowed), and (4) that it must represent the entirety of the dower owed to the widow. If the bride accepted any provision instead of a dower before marriage, she could not lay claim to one later; if she accepted a similar provision after marriage, she could choose between receiving a jointure or a dower (even if she had explicitly stated that she accepted the provision in place of a dower).

Following the introduction of legal jointures, jointures settled by a deed of joint tenancy were known as equitable jointures in law.

== See also ==
- Curtesy
- Elective share
