= Charles Zinzan =

English Acting Governor of Bombay

Charles Zinzan (died 1714) was the English Acting Governor of Bombay in the late 17th century.

He appears to have been a grandson of Sir Sigismund Zinzan of Molesey in Surrey, who was Master of Royal Sports. He was the Acting Governor of Bombay from 19 November 1684 to 1685. He died in 1714. His ancestors include the Vanlore family, some of whom used the surname Alexander.
