= Elective share =

An elective share is a term used in American law relating to inheritance, which describes a proportion of an estate which the surviving spouse of the deceased may claim in place of what they were left in the decedent's will. It may also be called a widow's share, statutory share, election against the will, right of election, or forced share.

== Function and operation ==
The elective share is the modern version of the English common law concepts of dower and curtesy, both of which reserved certain portions of a decedent's estate which were reserved for the surviving spouse to prevent them from falling into poverty and becoming a burden on the community.

Currently, the amount to be reserved for a spouse is determined by the law of the state where the estate is located. In most states, the elective share is between one-third and one-half of all the property in the estate, although many states require the marriage to have lasted a certain number of years for the elective share to be claimed, or adjust the share based on the length of the marriage, and the presence of minor children. Some states also reduce the elective share if the surviving spouse is independently wealthy.

In some jurisdictions, if the spouse claims the elective share, they get that amount, but nothing else from the estate. In other states, claiming an elective share has no effect on gifts under a will or through a trust (though things given by will or trust may fulfill in part the elective share portion). Obviously, there would be no point in seeking an elective share if the surviving spouse has already been willed more than they would receive under the statute. Furthermore, some assets held by the estate may be exempt from becoming part of the elective share, so their value is subtracted from the total value of the estate before the elective share is calculated.

Some states also permit children of the deceased to claim an elective share.

== Calculation of the augmented estate ==
The elective share is usually calculated from assets beyond those in the probate estate alone, and the assets that are added together to make this calculation are called an augmented estate. This calculation serves two functions. First, it prevents the decedent from effectively disinheriting the surviving spouse by either gifting away assets before death or by tying up assets in devices such as trusts or joint accounts that benefit third parties after the decedent's death. Second, it prevents the surviving spouse from taking too large an elective share, if the decedent had already transferred substantial assets to the spouse.

To accomplish that, the augmented estate is calculated by combining the value of the probate estate with such things as the value of gifts given by the decedent to third parties, property or accounts held in survivorship estates (such as a joint bank account, the proceeds of which would pass to the survivor among the account holders), the value of life insurance policies over which the decedent had the power to name the beneficiary, as well as gifts to the surviving spouse, and property held jointly with the surviving spouse.

The elective share in Florida gives a surviving spouse 30% of the elective estate, which includes all property owned by the decedent, property given away within one year of death, property inside a revocable trust (also known as a living trust), and pay on death accounts. The Florida homestead property of the decedent, whether owned by the decedent solely or also with the surviving spouse, is included in the elective share calculation (this change was made in 2017).

In New York law, the "right of election" is $50,000 of the augmented estate, plus 1/3 of the net estate remaining.
