= Wound Medal =

A Wound Medal is a medal, usually military, generally given to persons wounded or otherwise invalided as a result of combat action, and may refer to:

- Wound Medal (Austria-Hungary)
- Wound Medal (Independent State of Croatia) (1941-1945)
- Wound Medal (India)
- Wound Medal (Vietnam), South Vietnam
- Desha Putra Sammanaya, Sri Lanka

== Similar awards with other names ==
- Medal for the War Wounded, France
- Wound Badge, Germany, World War I and World War II
- Wound stripe#British Commonwealth, World War I and World War II
- Purple Heart, USA
- Wound stripe#Union of Soviet Socialist Republics, World War I and World War II

== See also ==
- List of wound decorations
