= Wound stripe =

Military decoration awarded to soldiers of various nations wounded in combat

A wound stripe is a distinction of dress bestowed on soldiers wounded in combat. It was typically worn on military uniform jackets.

== France ==
In the French Army, the wound chevron or Insigne des blessés militaires, was awarded beginning in 1916.

== British Commonwealth ==
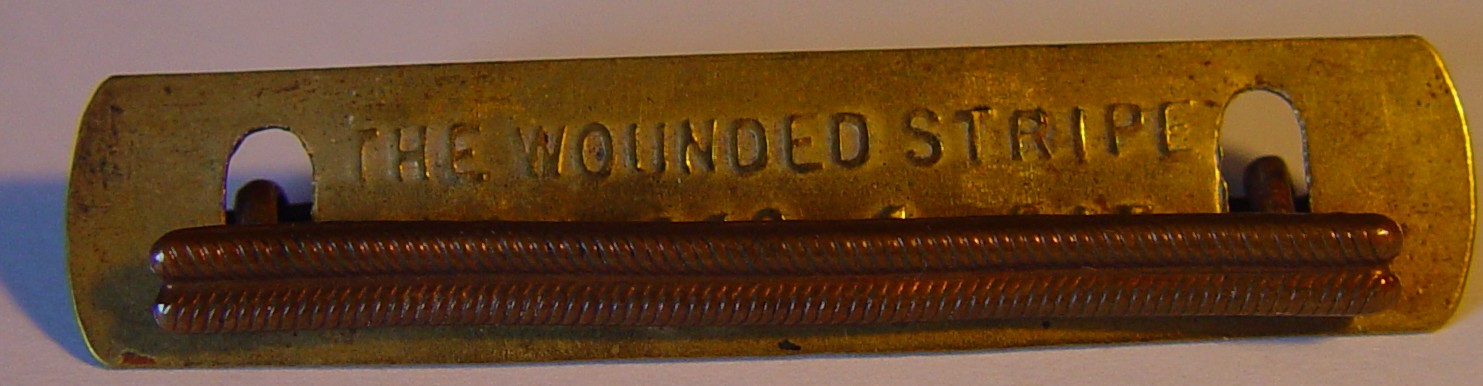
British Wound Stripe

The British Army began awarding a brass "Wound Stripe" in 1916, with approval by King George V. The badge was worn vertically on the left forearm and inset between the Good Conduct stripes, fastened through the uniform cloth. Additional badges were granted for subsequent wounds.

The badge was reintroduced in 1944 for the Second World War (1939–1945) and was discontinued after 1946. A yellow cloth version was introduced for use with Battle Dress. Previous awards during World War One were designated by a single red cloth stripe. British soldiers have not been awarded Wound Stripes for any conflict after World War Two.

Soldiers of the Australian Imperial Force, Canadian Expeditionary Force, New Zealand Expeditionary Force, and other Empire troops followed suit in the First World War, and issued wound stripes according to British practice. It was reintroduced for the Second World War but not the Korean War.

A version for the Canadian Forces uniform was developed and worn by soldiers injured on operational deployments beginning in the 1990s, including Afghanistan. The Sacrifice Medal replaced the wound stripe for all members of the Canadian Armed Forces in 2008. The award has also been opened to soldiers of an allied force or civilians working for Canadian Forces personnel. The wound stripe was for physical or mental injuries received in operations prior to 7 October 2001, after which Canadian Forces members wounded in action receive the Sacrifice Medal.

== Union of Soviet Socialist Republics ==
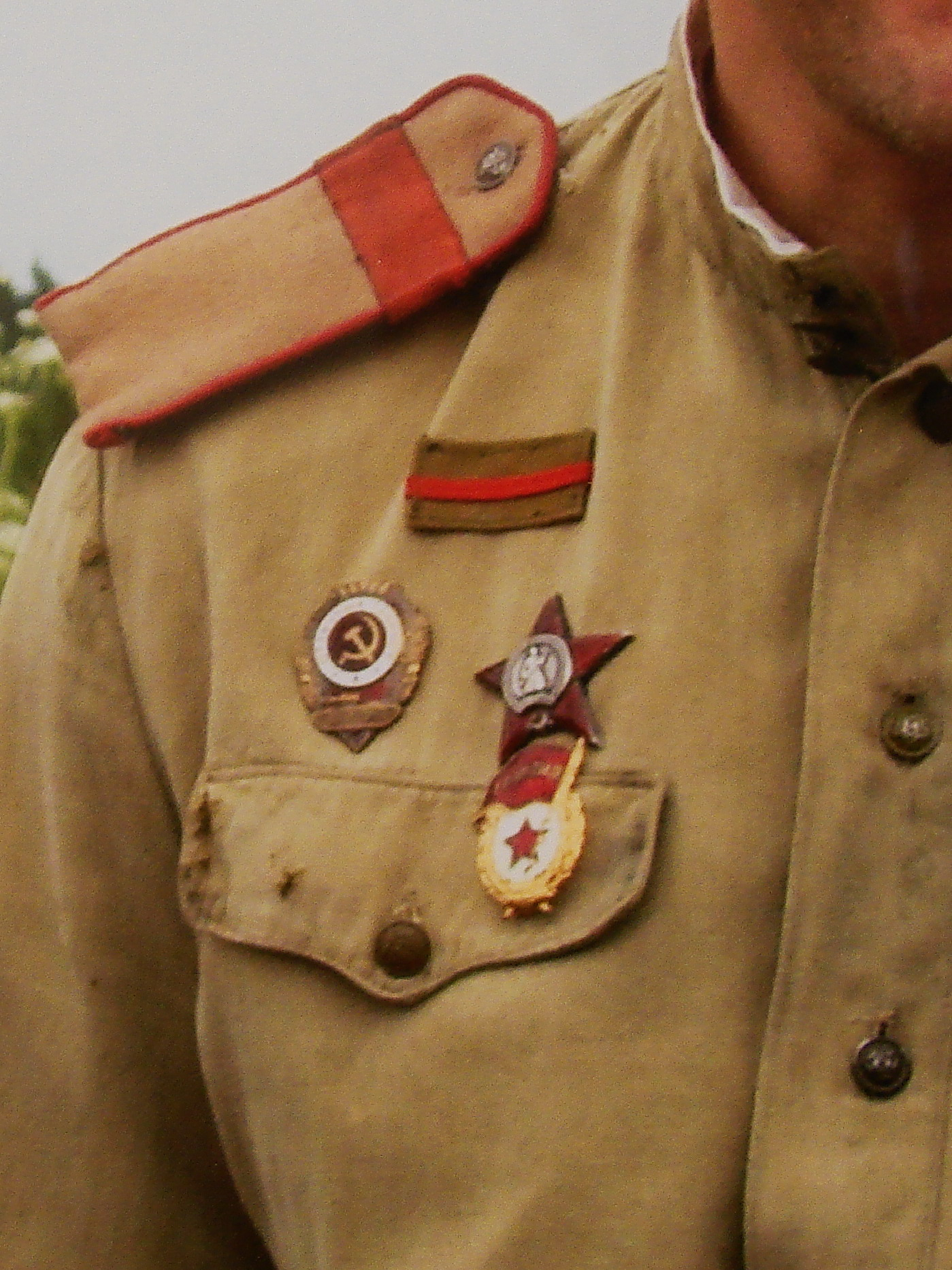
Wound Stripe on the Soviet uniform

Soviet soldiers in the Great Patriotic War wore a yellow cloth stripe over the right breast to indicate wounds received in battle requiring medical attention; a red stripe indicated less serious wounds.

== United States ==
In World War I United States soldiers received stripes called Wound Chevrons that were influenced by French practice. These looked exactly the same as Overseas Service Chevrons, but were always gold metallic-thread and worn on the lower right sleeve. (At that time the gold Overseas Chevron was worn on the lower left sleeve. Today its redesigned successor, the Overseas Service Bar, is worn on the right sleeve. Service Stripes are now worn on the left sleeve.) In 1932 the Wound Chevron was replaced by the Purple Heart, and World War I veterans could apply for the new medal.

== See also ==
- List of wound decorations by country
