= Good Conduct stripe =

British Army award

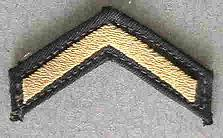
Good Conduct Medal. Personal possession of the Imperial Japanese Navy Natural History Captain.

The Good-Conduct stripe was a British Army award for good conduct during service in the Regular Army by an enlisted men. Commonwealth countries adopted the insignia as well.

== History ==
The insignia was a points-up chevron of NCO's lace worn on the lower sleeve of the uniform jacket. It was given to privates and lance corporals for 2, 6, 12, or 18 years' service without being subject to formal discipline. A further stripe was awarded for every 5 years of good service after the 18th (23-, 28-, 33-, 38-, 43-, or 48 years). If the soldier had never had their name written in the Regimental Conduct Book, they earned the 4th, 5th, 6th, and 7th stripes after 16-, 21-, 26-, and 32 years respectively.

It granted a pay bonus as a sort of "carrot" to get non-promotable enlisted men to behave. As the "stick", a stripe would be removed for an infraction (a write-up in the Regimental Conduct Book) and a court martial would forfeit all of them. The soldier would then have to start from the last stripe earned and work his way up again. It was also removed upon attaining the rank of corporal, as non-commissioned officers were promoted by merit and punished by loss of rank.

If a soldier left the service upon completing his enlistment and later re-enlisted as a private in the Regular Army, his Good Conduct stripes were reinstated at the last level he achieved. If a soldier transferred as a private to the Reserve he retained his Good-Conduct stripes. If a private in the Militia, Imperial Yeomanry or Territorial Force was mobilised they could receive Good-Conduct stripes for the cumulative duration of their active service. In the Pay Warrant of 1914 the recruit could now choose between Good Conduct pay (a bonus for each Good Conduct stripe earned) or Service pay (a smaller bonus for overseas service).

Introduced in 1836, they were originally worn on the lower right sleeve and were worn by privates, lance-corporals and corporals. On 1 March 1881 a general order moved them to the lower left sleeve. In 1939, the maximum number of chevrons worn were reduced to 5, regardless of how many had been earned. Queen’s Regulations 1961 paragraph 1086, issued as National Service was ending, awarded badges after 2 ½ years, 5, 10, 15, 20 etc without an upper limit. There has been no change since then to date, but there was a lack of enthusiasm to wear them after about 1970, both by units and by the soldiers themselves. The badges still appear in current dress regulations but they are in fact rarely seen, except when troops are engaged in Public Duties and RSM's ensure they are. However, Household troops ceased to do so over a period in the 1980s. The regiments report (Private correspondence with regimental adjutants) that they mark the Home Service tunics permanently such that they cannot be re-issued, an important consideration in thrifty times.

=== Royal Air Force ===
Introduced in the 1920s, the RAF granted Good Conduct Badges for 3, 8, or 13 years' good service in the Royal Air Force. Qualifying service also included previous continuous service in the Royal Navy, Royal Marines or Army before being transferred to the RAF under the Air Force (Constitution) Act 1917 and mobilisation while in the Royal Air Force Volunteer Reserve (RAFVR) or Royal Auxiliary Air Force (RAuxAF). Non-qualifying service included: service time before an Airman's 18th birthday ("boy's time"); service time as an Aircraft Apprentice, Apprentice Clerk or Boy Entrant (even if 18 years old or older) if enlisted after 31 December 1927; service time in which the Airman's conduct was rated as 'Indifferent' or lower; and any service time spent as a deserter.

=== Royal Navy ===
Good conduct stripes (called 'Good Conduct badges' in the Royal Navy), are worn by Able Seamen, Leading Seamen, and Petty Officers on the left arm, below the substantive rate (rank) badge in numbers 1A, 1B and 1C dress, and 1AW dress as well.(white tunic option only for Petty Officers.) Each stripe represents 4, 8 and 12 years service. Stripes can be deprived for bad behaviour, and restored for good.

Originally introduced in January 1849, they were originally awarded for 5, 10 and 15 years.Good conduct badges were awarded at the rate of 1d per diem. In June 1860, this was changed and they were awarded for 3, 8 and 13 years. On 1 February 1919 Good Conduct Pay or Badge Pay increased from 1d. to 3d per badge, per diem. From this date as well Royal Marines were in future to come under the same regulations as Naval Ratings, as regards Good Conduct Badges. Royal Marine ranks now in possession of more than three good conduct Badges were to be paid at the new rates, for three Badges only; Badges in excess of three to be regarded as honorary, and in the event of a Badge being forfeited the forfeiture in the first instance to be applied to a paid Badge. From 1 June 1946, Good Conduct Badges awarded after four, eight and twelve years, as it is today, and the Good Conduct Pay or Badge Pay was increased to 4d per badge, per diem, from 3d. From 1 April 1970, Good Conduct pay ceased to be awarded, with only the badges awarded after that date.

=== Canadian Army ===
The Canadian Army originally granted the stripes starting in 1914 during World War I. It was granted to Privates and Lance Corporals, Lance Bombardiers, and Acting Corporals for each 4-, 8-, 12-, or 16- years of good conduct during active service. During and after World War II, starting in 1940, it was granted for 2-, 6-, 12-, 18-, 23-, and 28-year's good conduct during service with the Permanent Force or the later Canadian Active Service Force / Canadian Army. If the soldier had never had their name written in the Regimental Conduct Book after 14 years good conduct during service, they earned the 4th, 5th, and 6th stripes after 16-, 21-, and 26-years respectively. It was worn with the Service Dress ("SD" or "No.2 Dress"), Khaki drill ("KD" or "No.6 Dress") and Battledress ("BD" or "No.5 Dress") uniforms. The wear of Good Conduct stripes was discontinued in 1968 after the British-style Commonwealth uniform was replaced by the new Canadian Armed Forces uniform.

== Popular culture ==
- Rudyard Kipling mentions Good Conduct stripes in the poem Cells, from his collection Barrack Room Ballads. The court-martialed narrator mourns how "They'll stop my pay, they'll cut away the stripes I used to wear [...]"
- Private Arthur "Nick" Carter of the King's Shropshire Light Infantry enlisted in 1901 and fought in the Second Boer War (1899–1902) and World War I (1914–1918). He served as a Private by choice until he retired in 1951. He had ten Good Conduct stripes on his uniform sleeve in a 1949 photo of him receiving his second clasp (for each 15 years of additional service) for his Long Service and Good Conduct Medal for 48 years of service.
- Lance Corporal Edward "Dutchy" Pearce of the Royal Inniskilling Fusiliers, wore 12 Good Conduct stripes. He enlisted in 1866 and was discharged in 1923, serving 57 continuous years with the British Army. L/Cpl Pearce was the longest serving enlisted soldier, as well as had the most Good Conduct stripes in British Army history.

== See also ==
- Commonwealth Army: Wound stripe & Overseas Service Chevron.
- US Army: Wound Chevron & Overseas Service Bar.
