= Akhilesh Saxena =

Indian Army Veteran

Captain Akhilesh Saxena
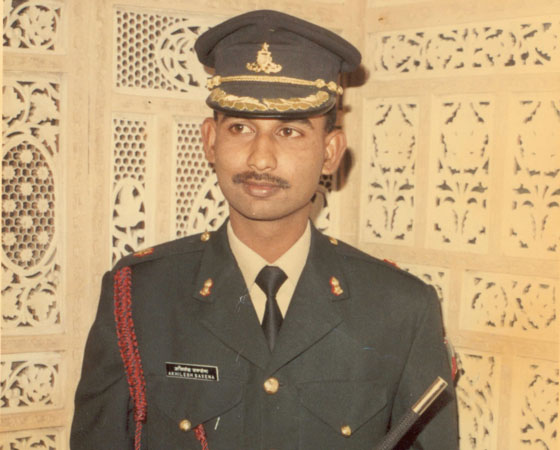

Personal details
- Born: Moradabad, Uttar Pradesh, India
- Spouse: Shikha Akhilesh Saxena

Military service
- Allegiance: India
- Branch/service: Indian Army
- Years of service: 1995–2002
- Rank: Captain
- Unit: Regiment of Artillery
- Commands: 2 Rajputana Rifles; 13 Jammu and Kashmir Rifles
- Battles/wars: Kargil War
- Award(s): Wound Medal

Akhilesh Saxena is an Indian Army veteran, who served during the Kargil War in 1999. He held the position of Forward Observation Officer and was attached to both the 2nd Battalion, Rajputana Rifles and the 13th Battalion, Jammu and Kashmir Rifles during the conflict. He was awarded the Wound Medal, a military decoration awarded to personnel who sustain wounds as a result of direct enemy action in operations or counter-insurgency actions.

During the war he was hit by bullets and splinters. He was brought to the Army Hospital by a special plane, where he was treated for a year. and he got premature retirement from the Army.

== Education ==
In 2002, he enrolled at the Faculty of Management Studies, University of Delhi, and completed his postgraduate management degree in 2004, receiving a gold medal for academic performance.

== Career ==
=== Military career ===
Saxena was commissioned into the Indian Army as an Artillery Officer on 9 December 1995. He was commissioned into the 223 Medium Artillery Regiment of the Indian Army. He was later posted to the 1889 Light Battery Regiment (now 1889 Missile Regiment), which took part in the Kargil War in 1999. During the conflict, he was attached to the 2 Rajputana Rifles and 13 Jammu and Kashmir Rifles as a Forward Observation Officer. In this role, he was responsible for coordinating artillery fire support during operations in the Tololing, Hump, and Three Pimples sectors.

On 29 June 1999, while directing fire support during one of the attacks, he was hit by bullets and splinters. He was initially treated on the battlefield and later He was brought to the Army Hospital by a special plane, where he was treated for a year. Due to the extent of his injuries, he was granted premature retirement from the Army.

=== Other ===
After retiring from the Indian Army, Saxena began working in the corporate sector. He joined Wipro through a campus placement program and later joined at Bharti Airtel. Currently he is serving as a Vice President at Tata Communications.

== Honours and recognition ==
He was awarded the Wound Medal, a military decoration awarded to personnel who sustain wounds as a result of direct enemy action in operations or counter-insurgency actions.

== In popular culture ==
Two books based on the experiences of Akhilesh Saxena during the Kargil War have been published. Nation First, in English, was published by Hachette India, and Kargil Yuddha: Veerta aur Deshbhakti ki Satya Gatha, in Hindi, was published by Prabhat Prakashan. Both books were authored by Shikha Akhilesh Saxena and include forewords by General Ved Prakash Malik and Dr. Ranjana Malik.
