= List of wound decorations by country =

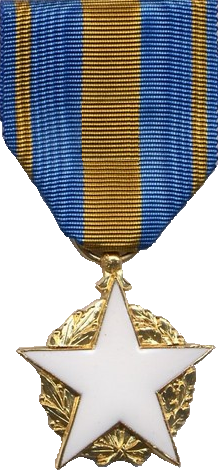
The French Insigne des blessés civils.

This list of wound decorations is an index of articles that describe notable awards given for wounds; usually, though not exclusively, to military personnel during wartime. Decorations can include wound stripes, medals, or other uniform adornments.

Medals are given to wounded soldiers to honor their sacrifices, create meaning for the pain they experience, and create a heroic identity for the wounded.

Country	Award	Description
United States	DEA Purple Heart Award	Awarded by the Drug Enforcement Administration to honor individuals who had lost their lives or been seriously injured enforcing the drug laws of the United States
United Kingdom	Elizabeth Cross	For next of kin of members of the British Armed Forces killed in action or as a result of a terrorist attack after World War II
France	Insigne des blessés civils	Civilians, irrespective of age or sex, who have been injured or maimed as a result of war.
France	Medal for the War Wounded	Wounded soldiers, prisoners of war, World War II deportees and internees from the French Resistance, and soldiers wounded in more recent conflicts
Canada	Memorial Cross	Mother, widow, widower, or next of kin of any member of the Canadian Forces who loses their life in active service, including peacekeeping, and other such international operations
France	National Medal of Recognition for victims of terrorism	French or foreign nationals who are victims of terrorism in France or abroad
Croatia	Order of the Croatian Cross	Croatian and foreign nationals who were severely wounded while participating in the Croatian War of Independence
United States	Purple Heart	Those wounded or killed while serving, on or after April 5, 1917, with the United States Armed Forces
Canada	Sacrifice Medal	Members of the Canadian Forces or allied forces wounded or killed in action, and to members whose death under honourable circumstances is a result of injury or disease related directly to military service
United States	Secretary of Defense Medal for the Defense of Freedom	Civilian employees of the United States Department of Defense who are killed or wounded in the line of duty
Sweden	Swedish Armed Forces Medal for Wounded in Battle	Swedish Armed Forces personnel wounded directly or indirectly as a result of battle during international mission
Sri Lanka	Desha Putra Sammanaya	Service personal wounded in a manner that is classified 'moderately severe' in action against the enemy, or died as a result of such an injury
Sri Lanka	Uththama Pooja Pranama Padakkama	Next of kin of all servicepersons of the military and police of Sri Lanka in recognition of a serviceperson's death in the line of duty
Germany	Wound Badge	Soldiers of the German armed forces that were wounded between 1918 and 1945, and civilians wounded in air raids
United States	Wound Chevron	Wounds which were received in combat against an enemy force or hospitalization following a gassing. Replaced by the Purple Heart in 1932
Poland	Wound Decoration	Wound or injury sustained in action against an enemy in defense of the country during the Polish–Soviet War
Austria-Hungary	Wound Medal	Soldiers and civilians attached to Austro-Hungarian military units who were wounded in combat, became disabled or suffered serious health damage in connection with military actions during World War I
Croatia	Wound Medal	Those who, as homeland defenders, were wounded or injured during combat with the enemy during World War II
India	Wound Medal	Those who sustain wounds as a result of direct enemy action in any type of operations or counter-insurgency actions
South Vietnam	Wound Medal	Personnel of the South Vietnamese military who, while engaged in armed combat with enemies of the Republic of Vietnam, were either wounded or killed in action
Norway	Wounded in Action Medal; Killed in Action Medal	Awarded to personnel that through combat action have been wounded. Can be awarded more than once, as shown with a silver star on the ribbon. Presented to the next of kin to personnel in or with the Norwegian Armed Forces that have been killed in action. As of 2022, 10 medals have been awarded.
International (Rojava)	The Medal for the Martyrs	Presented to the next of kin to the international fighters and volunteers with the Kurdish forces that were killed while in Syria or died as a result of their service in Syria.
Sweden	Pasewalk and Neukalen medals	Medals given to wounded soldiers in the Pomeranian War in 1760 and 1762.

== See also ==
- Lists of awards
- List of military decorations
- List of highest military decorations by country
- Wound stripe
