= Uttam Jeevan Raksha Padak =

- Ribbon of the medal
- Type: Civilian Lifesaving award
- Description: ₹1,50,000 cash award lump-sum monetary allowance
- Country: India
- Presented by: Government of India
- Ribbon: Red with blue edges and two thin central green stripes
- Obverse: Open hand
- Reverse: Emblem of India
- Established: 30 September 1961

Precedence
- Next (higher): Vishisht Seva Medal
- Next (lower): Wound Medal

The Uttam Jeevan Raksha Padak (Great Life Saving Medal) is a civilian lifesaving award presented by the Government of India. Established on 30 September 1961, the award was originally called the Jeevan Raksha Padak, Class II.

== Criteria ==
The Uttam Jeevan Raksha Padak is awarded to civilians to reward saving lives from drowning, fire, or mine accidents. It is awarded for "courage and promptitude under circumstances of very great danger to the life of the rescue".

The Uttam Jeevan Raksha Padak may be awarded to members of the armed forces, police, or fire services when recognizable acts take place outside beyond the course of their duty. Subsequent awards are recognized by the addition of a medal bar to the ribbon. The medal may be awarded posthumously.

== Appearance ==
The Uttam Jeevan Raksha Padak is a circular silver medal 58 mm (2.3 in) in diameter. On the obverse in the centre is an open hand in the Abhayamudra pose with Ma Bhaya above and Uttam Jeevan Raksha Padak below in Devanagri script. The reverse bears the Emblem of India and the motto Satyameva Jayate.

The ribbon of the medal is red, 32 mm (1.3 in) wide. At the edges are light blue stripes and two green centre stripes in the middle of the ribbon. These colors are meant to represent fire (red), water (blue), and life (green).
