= Sacrifice Medal =

- Reverse of the medal
- Type: Military medal
- Awarded for: Members of the Canadian Forces, an allied force, or a Canadian civilian under the authority of the Canadian Forces, died or been wounded under honourable circumstances in the line of service.
- Presented by: The monarch of Canada
- Status: Currently awarded
- Established: 29 August 2008
- First award: 9 November 2009

Highlights
- Total: 1,290 (as of 31 December 2024)
- Total awarded posthumously: approx 150
- Ribbon of the Sacrifice Medal

Precedence
- Next (higher): Royal Victorian Medal
- Next (lower): Korea Medal

The Sacrifice Medal (French: Médaille du sacrifice) is a military medal awarded by the Canadian monarch, usually through the Governor General of Canada, to members of the Canadian Forces or allied forces wounded or killed in action, and to members whose death under honourable circumstances is a result of injury or disease related directly to military service. It was created in 2008 as a replacement for the Wound Stripe.

== Design ==
The Sacrifice Medal is in the form of a 37-millimetre-diameter (1.5 in) silver disc topped by St. Edward's Crown, symbolizing the Canadian monarch's role as the fount of honour. On the obverse is an effigy of the reigning sovereign and Commander-in-Chief of the Canadian Forces wearing a diadem of maple leaves and snowflakes, surrounded by the inscriptions Elizabeth II Dei gratia Regina (Latin for 'Elizabeth II, by the grace of God, Queen') and Canada. On the reverse is the word sacrifice alongside a depiction of the statue Mother Canada, one of Walter Seymour Allward's allegorical figures adorning the Canadian National Vimy Memorial in France. The recipient's name, along with his or her rank and service number for those in the military, is inscribed around the medal's edge.

This medallion is worn at the left chest, suspended on a 31.8 mm wide ribbon coloured with vertical stripes in purposefully sombre red (recalling spilled blood), black (symbolizing grief and loss), and white (representative of both hope and peace). Should a person already possessing a Sacrifice Medal be awarded the medal again for subsequent injuries, he or she is granted a medal bar—in silver with raised edges and bearing a maple leaf—for wear on the ribbon from which the original medal is suspended.

== Eligibility ==
On 29 August 2008, Queen Elizabeth II, on the advice of her Cabinet under Prime Minister Stephen Harper, created the Sacrifice Medal to recognize any member of the Canadian Forces, soldier of an allied force, or a civilian working for the Canadian Forces, who after 7 October 2001 was killed or wounded under honourable circumstances and as a result of hostile action or perceived hostile action. If not fatal, the wound received must be serious enough to require attention from a medic, and the treatment must have been recorded in the individual's medical file. These tenets were later augmented when, on 19 October 2009, the Department of National Defence announced that all service related deaths would qualify for the Sacrifice Medal, whether as a result of direct hostile action or not.

== See also ==
- Canadian order of precedence (decorations and medals)
- Elizabeth Cross
- Memorial Cross
- Memorial Plaque
- State decoration
- List of wound decorations
