= Uththama Pooja Pranama Padakkama =

- Type: Military decoration
- Awarded for: Death in action
- Presented by: Sri Lanka
- Eligibility: Next of kin of all ranks killed- or missing in action of the regular or volunteer forces of the Military of Sri Lanka and Sri Lanka Police
- Clasps: None
- Status: Currently awarded
- Established: Gazette No. 1662/38, 16 July 2010
- First award: 2010
- Ribbon
- Related: Parama Weera Vibhushanaya

The Uththama Pooja Pranama Padakkama (Medal of Honour for Supreme Sacrifice) (Sinhala: උත්තම පූජා ප්‍රණාම පදක්කම uṭama pūjā pranāma padakkama) is the medal presented to the next of kin of all servicepersons of the military and police of Sri Lanka in recognition of a serviceperson's death in the line of duty. It is awarded to the families of personnel confirmed killed in action or missing in action.

== Design ==
The medal is gold-plated metal circular in shape, suspended from a blue ribbon. The obverse face holds at its center an outline of the Sri Lankan island mass incised in its center with an engraved form of a male soldier holding a weapon with his left hand, and the right raised in triumph. The engraving is meant to symbolize a lack of life, indicating the death of the serviceperson. The figure stands on a pair of upraised hands from below, symbolizing his/her family and their support and encouragement contributing to the serviceperson's sacrifice. Both faces of the medal are bordered by stylized crepuscular rays along the edge, meant to symbolize the brighter future the individual ensured for their nation with their sacrifice. The obverse holds the Emblem of Sri Lanka with the Sinhala inscription ශ්‍රී ලංකා ප්‍රජාතාන්ත්‍රික සමාජවාදී ජනරජය (Democratic Socialist Republic of Sri Lanka) engraved in a half circle at the bottom of the medal.

== Award process ==
The medal has thus far been awarded by the Secretary to the Ministry of Defence. Award regulations stipulate that the medal be awarded jointly to the spouse, children and parents of a dead or missing serviceperson should he/she have been married at the time of (confirmed or suspected) death, and to the parents only should the serviceperson have been unmarried at the time of death.

The President has the authority to annul or restore the award to any person on the recommendation of the Defence Secretary.

Being a posthumous award, the medal has no accompanying ribbon bar.

== See also ==
- Elizabeth Cross
- Memorial Cross
- List of wound decorations
