= Secretary of Defense Medal for the Defense of Freedom =

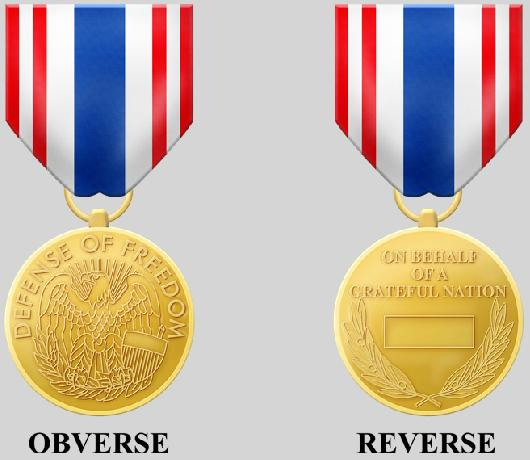
- Secretary of Defense Medal for the Defense of Freedom
- Type: Medal
- Awarded for: Being injured or killed during the course of official duties
- Presented by: the Secretary of Defense
- Eligibility: Civilian employees of the U.S. Department of Defense
- Status: Currently awarded
- Established: September 27, 2001

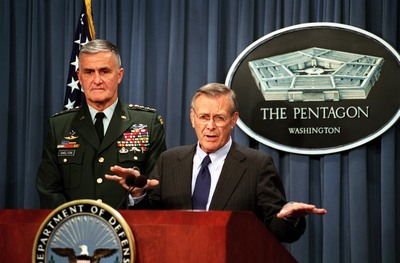
Secretary of Defense Donald Rumsfeld announces the establishment of the Secretary of Defense Medal for the Defense of Freedom on Sept. 27, 2001 with Chairman of the Joint Chiefs of Staff Gen. Henry H. Shelton

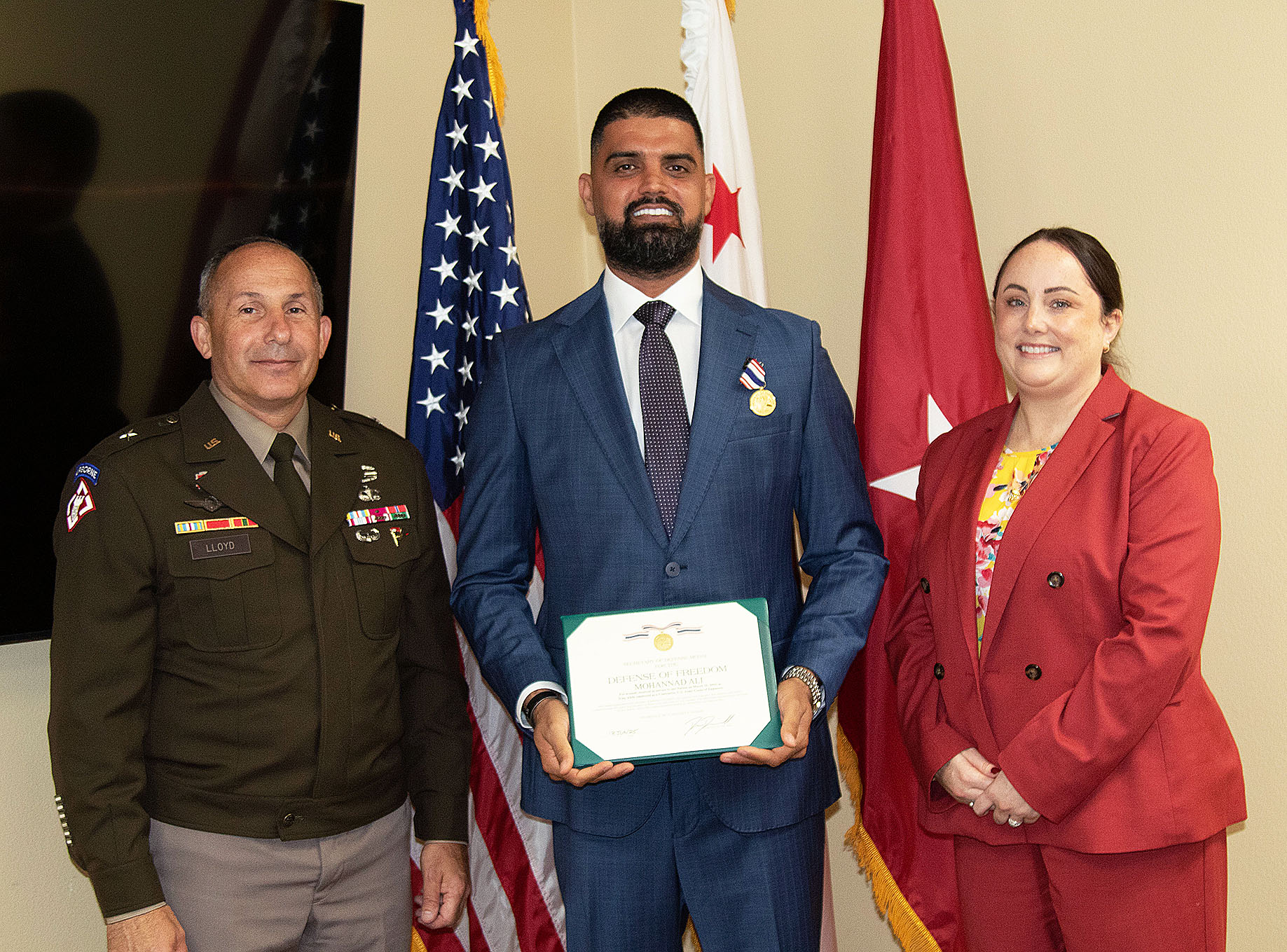
US Army Corps of Engineers contractor Mohannad Ali awarded with the Secretary of Defense Medal for the Defense of Freedom

The Secretary of Defense Medal for the Defense of Freedom is a decoration established to acknowledge civilian employees of the United States Department of Defense (DoD) who are killed or wounded in the line of duty.

== Description ==
The medal was created in 2001; the United States Army’s Institute of Heraldry developed the medal.

=== Medal ===
The eagle and shield exemplify the principles of freedom on which the United States was founded and the defense of these freedoms. The laurel is emblematic of honor and high achievement.

=== Ribbon ===
Red, white, and blue are the national colors of the United States. The red stripes commemorate valor and sacrifice. The wide blue stripe represents strength. The white stripes symbolize liberty. The number of red stripes represents the four terrorist attacks using hijacked airplanes, and the single blue stripe represents the terrorist attack on the Pentagon on September 11, 2001.

=== Certificate ===
A certificate signed by the Secretary of the Army will accompany the medal.

== Eligibility ==
The medal shall be awarded to any DoD civilian employee meeting the definition of “employee” under title 5 United States Code, Section 2105, and who is eligible for an award under DoD 1400.25-M, Subchapter 451, “Awards,” including employees of non-appropriated fund activities, when killed or wounded by hostile action while serving under any competent authority of the Department under conditions for which a military member would be eligible for receipt of the Purple Heart. Additionally, the Secretary of Defense has discretionary authority to award this medal to non-Defense personnel who are otherwise qualified to be awarded the medal based on their involvement in DoD activities.

=== Criteria ===
Eligibility criteria for the medal are aligned as closely as possible to those for the Purple Heart for members of the United States Armed Forces; this medal differs from other medals in that it is not “recommended.” The employee is “entitled” to the medal if the employee is eligible under Section 4 and if the conditions or criteria in this paragraph are present. Hostile action may involve, but is not limited to, the use of conventional or nuclear weapons, chemical or biological agents, explosives, or missiles. The medal shall be awarded to employees who are killed or who sustain injury due to hostile action against the United States, or killed or wounded while rescuing or attempting to rescue any other employee or individual subjected to injuries sustained under such conditions. The wound for which the award is made must have required treatment by a medical officer, and records of medical treatment for wounds or injuries received in action must have been made a matter of official record.

=== Limitations on awarding ===
The medal is authorized for the incident of death or the first wound suffered under the conditions indicated above. The medal itself may be awarded only once; however, for subsequent events that would require the award of the medal, a device will be awarded to attach to the ribbon of the medal.

=== Posthumous awards ===
The medal may be awarded posthumously and, when so awarded, may be presented to a representative of the deceased member’s family.

== Awarding practice ==
Since 2001, more than 1,700 civilian contractors working for the US military in Iraq and Afghanistan have died, and nearly 40,000 have been injured. Former US military contractors complain that their injuries are largely overlooked. It is unclear how many people have received the Secretary of Defense Medal for the Defense of Freedom. There is no central register of recipients, nor are the award ceremonies generally announced publicly. They are not included in the official Pentagon list of casualties from the wars in Iraq and Afghanistan. Large companies such as DynCorp or KBR nominate their employees. The Department of Defence then decides on the awards. Some awards are made rather anonymously, sometimes only years later. In 2010, for example, civilian contractors received the medal for injuries sustained in 2005 and 2006.

== See also ==
- Recipients of the Secretary of Defense Medal for the Defense of Freedom
- Awards and decorations of the United States government
- List of wound decorations
