= Vishisht Seva Medal =

Peacetime Military Decoration

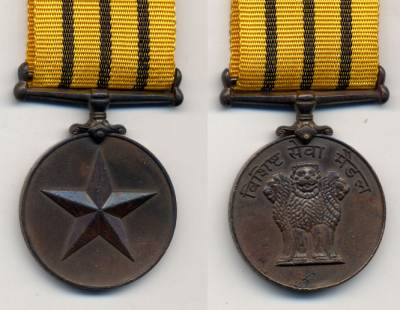
- Type: Military medal Service medal
- Awarded for: Distinguished service, to all ranks of the armed forces
- Country: India
- Presented by: President of India
- Established: 26 January 1960

Precedence
- Next (higher): Sena Medal (Army); Nau Sena Medal (Navy); Vayu Sena Medal (Air Force)
- Equivalent: Yudh Seva Medal (Note: Though the Vishisht Seva Medal is placed below the Yudh Seva Medal in the precedence, it is considered as a peacetime equivalent of Yudh Seva Medal.)
- Next (lower): Uttam Jeevan Raksha Padak

The Vishisht Seva Medal (VSM, lit. 'Distinguished Service Medal') is a decoration of the Indian Armed Forces. It is awarded to recognize "distinguished service of a high order" to all ranks of the Indian Armed Forces.

From 1980, the Yudh Seva Medal was introduced to recognize exceptional services in an operational environment. Since then the VSM has been restricted to non-operational service.

== History ==
The Vishisht Seva Medal was originally instituted as the "Vishisht Seva Medal, Class III" on 26 January 1960. Five other medals were instituted on the same day - the Sainya Seva Medal, Sena Medal, Nao Sena Medal and the Vayu Sena Medal. It was renamed on 27 January 1961, and the badge signed.

== Eligibility ==
The award may be granted posthumously and subsequent awards are represented by a bar worn on the ribbon. The award carries with it the right to use "VSM" as post-nominal letters. The medal was originally established as the "Vishisht Seva Medal, Class III". It was renamed to its present name on 27 January 1967. The design of the medal remained unchanged and the change be reflected only in the records.

== Medal ==
The medal is a 35-mm circular medal, with a five-pointed star in the centre. It is suspended from a straight-bar suspender with the name on the edge. The state emblem with the name of the decoration in Hindi above - "Vishisht Seva Medal" in Hindi. The ribbon is 32 mm long in yellow, with three 2 mm dark blue stripes dividing it into four equal parts
