= Overseas Service Chevron =

The Overseas Service Chevron was created by the British Army on 20 December 1917 and was awarded for each year of overseas service. It was retroactive to December 31, 1914, and was eligible for award until May 1, 1920.

== British Army ==
Overseas service was calculated from the day the soldier disembarked from the United Kingdom. A blue chevron was awarded for each 12 months of overseas service after December 31, 1914, with a maximum of 4 blue chevrons (or 5 if the soldier served in Russia after the war). A single red chevron could be awarded for at least a year or more of overseas service before December 31, 1914, and was worn under the blue chevron(s). The Overseas Chevrons were worn on the lower right sleeve of the uniform jacket. Official wear was discontinued in 1922.

== Canadian Army ==
=== World War I ===
The Canadian Armed Forces used the same Overseas Service Chevrons in World War One as the British. It was discontinued in 1941 except for the Veteran's Guard of Canada.

=== World War II ===
During World War Two the Canadian Armed Forces adopted a new set of Overseas Chevrons to be worn on the lower left sleeve. It was created in 1942 and was retroactive to September 10, 1939. Recipients had to have been servicemen in the Canadian Active Service Force or have joined the CASF on or after September 10, 1940, to qualify. Each 12 months of war service overseas was represented by a black chevron on green (later changed to a red chevron). A year or more of pre-war service on or before September 10, 1939, was designated by a white chevron (which took the place of the World War I Overseas Chevrons). It was moved to the lower right sleeve in 1944.

Units in Canada were allowed to wear them, but British rules forbade their wear in the United Kingdom or a European war zone until 1944. Perhaps this was due to potential confusion with the Free French Army's rank insignia for Corporal, Sergeant and Corporal Chef - which was a series of red or red-over-silver chevrons. Or perhaps they could be confused with the British Army's rifle-green Good Conduct stripes worn by the Rifles regiments or the red Good Conduct stripes worn by the Military Police.

== See also ==
- Good Conduct stripe
