= Insigne des blessés civils =

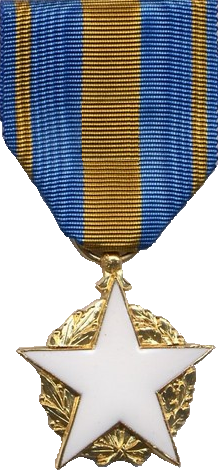
- Awarded for: Injury sustained during time of war
- Presented by: France
- Eligibility: Civilians
- Status: Unofficial
- Ribbon Bar of the Medal

The Insigne des blessés civils ("Wounded Civilians Badge") is a French distinction for civilians, irrespective of age or sex, who have been injured or maimed as a result of war.

== History ==
Maurice Barres, advocate of the National Federation of the Disabled and President of the League of Patriots, is credited with the idea for the Badge of Wounded Civilians. Early in the Great War, he wrote two articles in the newspaper L'Echo de Paris, first on 28 March 1915 and another on June 10 1915, calling for the creation of this distinctive insignia. The purpose was to publicly designate "un homme dont les blessures, l'infirmité, la maladie proviennent d'un fait de guerre" ("a man whose injury, disability, illness comes from an act of war").

On July 18, 1918, a decree made at the initiative of Minister of the Interior, which instituted a lapel pin for civilian victims of war. This award is presented:

- for World War I 1914-1918, by order of the Minister of Interior after consulting a board meeting at Head of the department of residence of the candidate.
- for World War II 1939-1945, by the Minister of Veterans and War Victims, the candidate must be a pensioner or civilian casualties of war.

La Grande Chancellerie de la Légion d'honneur does not recognize this medal, or the military version, as an official decoration, therefore it is not mentioned on any order of precedence list. However, in view of the importance which many of its owners have, it is widely worn.

== Description of the Medal ==
Currently, the most commonly worn medal is uniface of gilt bronze, 30 mm in diameter. It consists of a white enamel star encircled by a wreath of oak and laurel leaves. The medal hangs from a ribbon of blue and yellow. When the ribbon bar is worn alone it has a white star clasp.

== See also ==
- Ribbons of the French military and civil awards
- List of wound decorations
