= DEA Purple Heart Award =

Award given by the US Drug Enforcement Administration

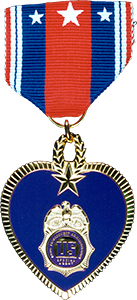
- Awarded for: Honoring individuals who have died or been seriously injured enforcing United States drug laws.
- Country: The United States
- Presented by: Drug Enforcement Administration
- First award: 1996

The DEA Purple Heart Award is an award given by the United States Drug Enforcement Administration to honor individuals who had lost their lives or been seriously injured enforcing the drug laws of the United States.

== History ==
On January 5, 1996, the DEA Purple Heart Award was established to honor individuals who had lost their lives or been seriously injured enforcing the drug laws of the United States. This was a result of the Hispanic Advisory Committee to then DEA Administrator Thomas A. Constantine suggesting the creation of an award to honor the “thousands of men and women sworn to enforce the drug laws of the United States who deserve the full benefit of our recognition of the inherent dangers of our profession”.

The award is a heart-shaped pendant with a DEA Special Agent's badge embossed a purple background and it suspended form a red, white, and blue ribbon. The award is presented in a glass-front shadowbox and is accompanied by a lapel pin showing a smaller version of the pendant.

In 1998, the DEA's SAC Advisory Committee expanded the awarding of the Purple Heart to state and local law enforcement officers who were killed or wounded in the line of duty while working with DEA.

As of 2011, 93 individuals had been awarded the DEA Purple Heart Award.

== Eligibility ==
The following criteria must be met in order to be eligible for the DEA Purple Heart Award:

- Individuals must have been seriously injured or killed during the performance of duties in an official capacity.
- Their injuries or death must have been direct results of hostile or criminal action.
- Their injuries required medical treatment or caused death.
- Individuals must be any active, retired, or deceased employee of the Drug Enforcement Administration (or its predecessor agencies, such as the Bureau of Narcotics and Dangerous Drugs, the Federal Bureau of Narcotics, or the Bureau of Drug Abuse Control) or a state or local law enforcement officer who was killed or wounded while working with the DEA.

== SIU Purple Heart Award ==
In 2012, the DEA established the DEA SIU Purple Heart Award to honor individuals of foreign law enforcement partners that supported the DEA in Special Investigative (SIU) programs.

Notable recipients of the DEA Special Investigative Purple Heart Award include Colombian National Police Officers Sergio Antonio Castro and Franklin Moreno Lopez (the first two recipients of the award), along with Peruvian National Police officer Edgar Wilber Quispe Rojas.

As of 2017, 23 police officers have been awarded the DEA SIU Purple Heart.

== See also ==
- Awards and decorations of the United States government
- Purple Heart
- List of wound decorations
