= Purple Heart =

United States military decoration for wounded or killed

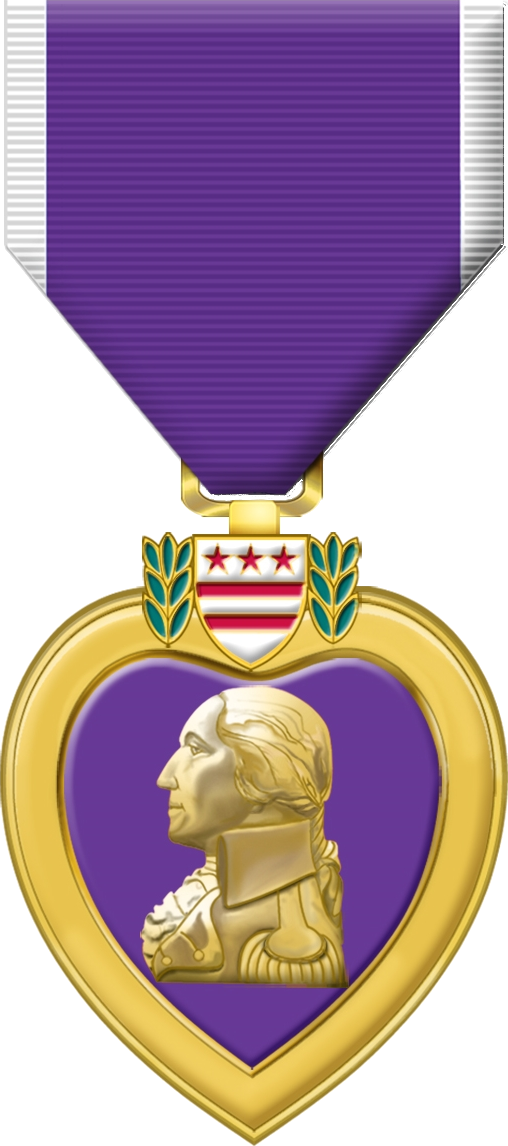
- Obverse
- Type: Military medal
- Awarded for: "Being wounded or killed in any action against an enemy of the United States or as a result of an act of any such enemy or opposing armed forces"
- Description: Obverse profile of George Washington
- Presented by: United States Department of the Army; United States Department of the Navy; United States Department of the Air Force; United States Department of Homeland Security
- Eligibility: Military personnel
- Reverse
- Status: Currently awarded
- First award: 22 February 1932

Highlights
- Total: Approximately 1,910,162 (as of 5 June 2010)
- Total awarded posthumously: Approximately 430,000
- Total recipients: over 2,000,000 (including eligible casualties in World War I who may not have been awarded the Purple Heart)
- Service ribbon

Precedence
- Next (higher): Bronze Star Medal
- Next (lower): Defense Meritorious Service Medal

The Purple Heart is a United States military decoration awarded in the name of the president to those wounded or killed while serving on or after 5 April 1917, with the U.S. military. With its forerunner, the Badge of Military Merit, which took the form of a heart made of purple cloth, the Purple Heart is the oldest military award still given to U.S. military members. The National Purple Heart Hall of Honor is located in New Windsor, New York.

== History ==
The original Purple Heart, designated as the Badge of Military Merit, was established by George Washington – then the commander-in-chief of the Continental Army – by order from his Newburgh, New York, headquarters on 7 August 1782. The Badge of Military Merit was only awarded to three Revolutionary War Soldiers by Washington himself. Washington authorized his subordinate officers to issue Badges of Merit as appropriate. Although never abolished, the award of the badge was not proposed again officially until after World War I.

On 10 October 1927, Army Chief of Staff General Charles Pelot Summerall directed that a draft bill be sent to Congress "to revive the Badge of Military Merit". The bill was withdrawn and action on the case ceased on 3 January 1928, but the office of the Adjutant General was instructed to file all materials collected for possible future use. A number of private interests sought to have the medal re-instituted in the Army; this included the board of directors of the Fort Ticonderoga Museum in Ticonderoga, New York.

On 7 January 1931, Summerall's successor, General Douglas MacArthur, confidentially reopened work on a new design, involving the Washington Commission of Fine Arts. Elizabeth Will, an Army heraldic specialist in the Office of the Quartermaster General, was named to redesign the newly revived medal, which became known as the Purple Heart. Using general specifications provided to her, Will created the design sketch for the present medal of the Purple Heart. The new design, which exhibits a profile bust of George Washington, was issued on the bicentennial of Washington's birth.

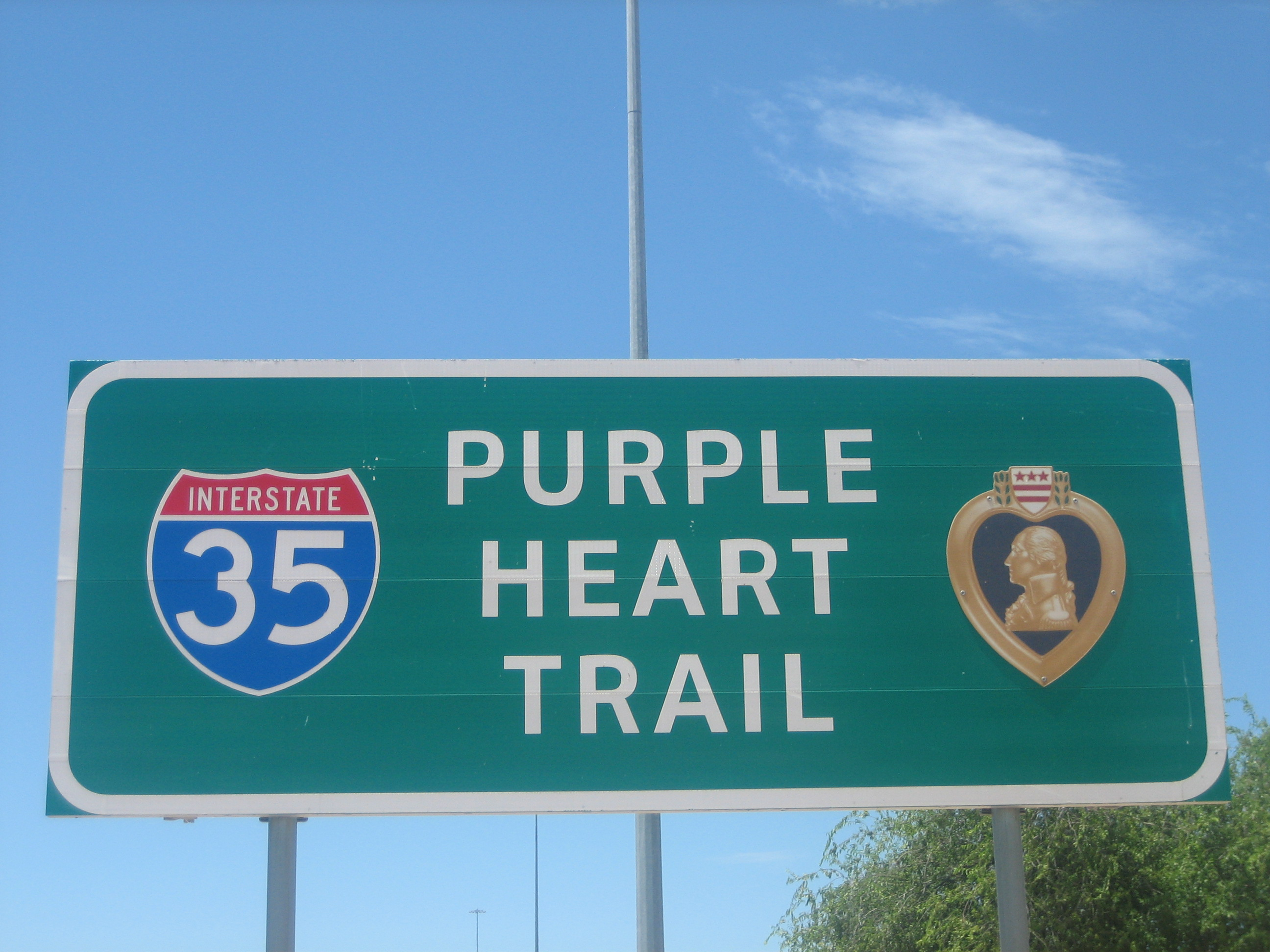
Sign on Interstate 35 designating the Purple Heart Trail.

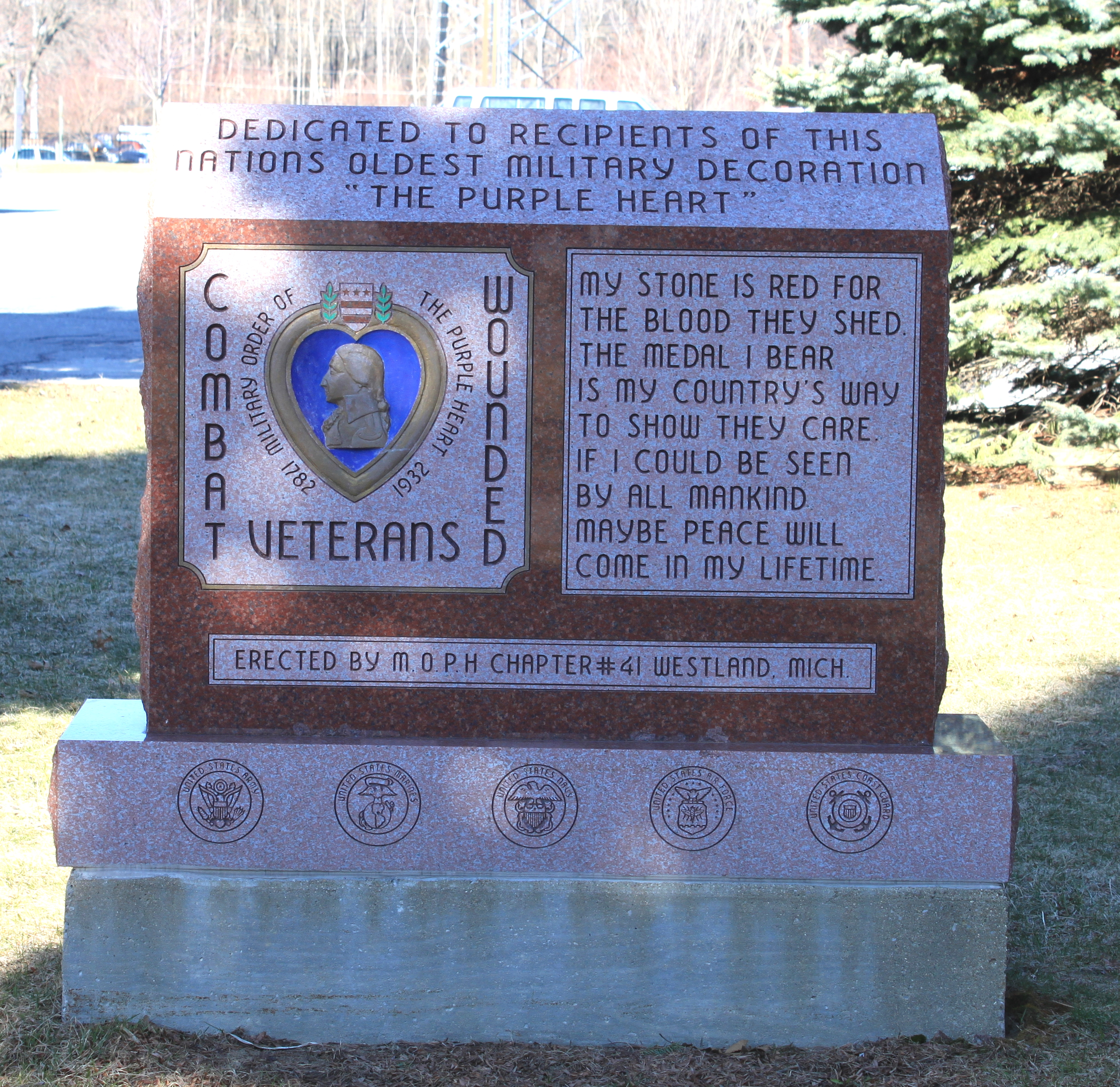
Purple Heart Memorial, Westland, Michigan

The Commission of Fine Arts solicited plaster models from three leading sculptors for the medal, selecting that of John R. Sinnock of the Philadelphia Mint in May 1931. By executive order of the president of the United States, the Purple Heart was revived on the 200th anniversary of George Washington's birth, out of respect to his memory and military achievements, by War Department General Order No. 3, dated 22 February 1932.

The criteria were announced in a War Department circular dated 22 February 1932, and authorized award to soldiers, upon their request, who had been awarded the Meritorious Service Citation Certificate, Army Wound Ribbon, or were authorized to wear Wound Chevrons subsequent to 5 April 1917, the day before the United States entered World War I. The first Purple Heart was awarded to MacArthur. During the early period of American involvement in World War II (8 December 1941 – 22 September 1943), the Purple Heart was awarded both for wounds received in action against the enemy and for meritorious performance of duty. With the establishment of the Legion of Merit, by an Act of Congress, the practice of awarding the Purple Heart for meritorious service was discontinued. By Executive Order 9277, dated 3 December 1942, the decoration was applied to all services; the order required reasonable uniform application of the regulations for each of the Services. This executive order also authorized the award only for wounds received. For both military and civilian personnel during the World War II era, to meet eligibility for the Purple Heart, Army Regulation 600–45, dated 22 September 1943, and 3 May 1944, required identification of circumstances.

After the award was re-authorized in 1932 some U.S. Army wounded from conflicts prior to the First World War applied for, and were awarded, the Purple Heart:

... veterans of the Civil War and Indian Wars, as well as the Spanish–American War, China Relief Expedition (Boxer Rebellion), and Philippine Insurrection also were awarded the Purple Heart. This is because the original regulations governing the award of the Purple Heart, published by the Army in 1932, provided that any soldier who had been wounded in any conflict involving U.S. Army personnel might apply for the new medal. There were but two requirements: the applicant had to be alive at the time of application (no posthumous awards were permitted) and he had to prove that he had received a wound that necessitated treatment by a medical officer.

Subject to the approval of the Secretary of Defense, Executive Order 10409, dated 12 February 1952, revised authorizations to include the Service Secretaries. Dated 25 April 1962, Executive Order 11016, included provisions for the posthumous award of the Purple Heart. Dated 23 February 1984, Executive Order 12464, authorized award of the Purple Heart as a result of terrorist attacks, or while serving as part of a peacekeeping force, subsequent to 28 March 1973.

On 13 June 1985, the Senate approved an amendment to the 1985 Defense Authorization Bill, which changed the precedence of the Purple Heart award, from immediately above the Good Conduct Medal to immediately above the Meritorious Service Medals. Public Law 99-145 authorized the award for wounds received as a result of friendly fire. Public Law 104-106 expanded the eligibility date, authorizing the award of the Purple Heart to a former prisoner of war who was wounded after 25 April 1962. The National Defense Authorization Act for the Fiscal Year 1998 (Public Law 105–85) changed the criteria to delete authorization for the award of the Purple Heart to any non-military U.S. national serving under competent authority in any capacity with the Armed Forces. This change was effective 18 May 1998.

In February 2015, the National Defense Authorization Act was amended to include "attacks carried out by individuals or entities in communication with a foreign terrorist organization beforehand and the act was inspired or motivated by the foreign terrorist organization" when considering awarding the Purple Heart medal. Secretary of the Army John McHugh announced the change to reflect that several service members would be receiving the medal as a result of the 2009 terror attacks at Fort Hood. This authorization would again be used for the Little Rock Recruiting Office shooting and the NAS Pensacola shooting. It would apparently be used again in 2026 after Secretary of Defense Pete Hegseth announced that the two West Virginia National Guard soldiers shot in Washington D.C. would also be awarded the medal.

During World War II, 1,506,000 Purple Heart medals were manufactured, many in anticipation of the estimated casualties resulting from the planned Allied invasion of Japan. By the end of the war, even accounting for medals lost, stolen, or wasted, nearly 500,000 remained. The total combined American military casualties of the seventy years following the end of World War II—including the Korean and Vietnam Wars—did not exceed that number. In 2000, there remained 120,000 Purple Heart medals in stock between all US Armed Forces. The existing surplus allowed combat units in Iraq and Afghanistan to keep Purple Hearts on hand for immediate award to soldiers wounded in the field. The Defense Supply Center in Philadelphia (DSCP), responsible for overseeing the production and distribution of the medals to each branch of the US Military, has ordered the creation of thousands more Purple Hearts since 2000. Identical in specification to those made in the 1940s, these new medals are today interspersed with stocks of the old surplus.

In 2009 National Geographic estimated the number of Purple Hearts given as:

- World War I: 320,518
- World War II: 1,076,245
- Korean War: 118,650
- Vietnam War: 351,794
- Persian Gulf War: 607
- Afghanistan War: 12,534 (as of 18 November 2018)
- Iraq War: 35,411 (as of 18 November 2018)
- Operation Inherent Resolve: 76 (as of 4 May 2020)
- United Nations Multidimensional Integrated Stabilization Mission in Mali, MINUSMA super camp attack: 2 (as of April 14, 2018)

The 7th of August of every year is recognized as "National Purple Heart Day".

== Criteria ==
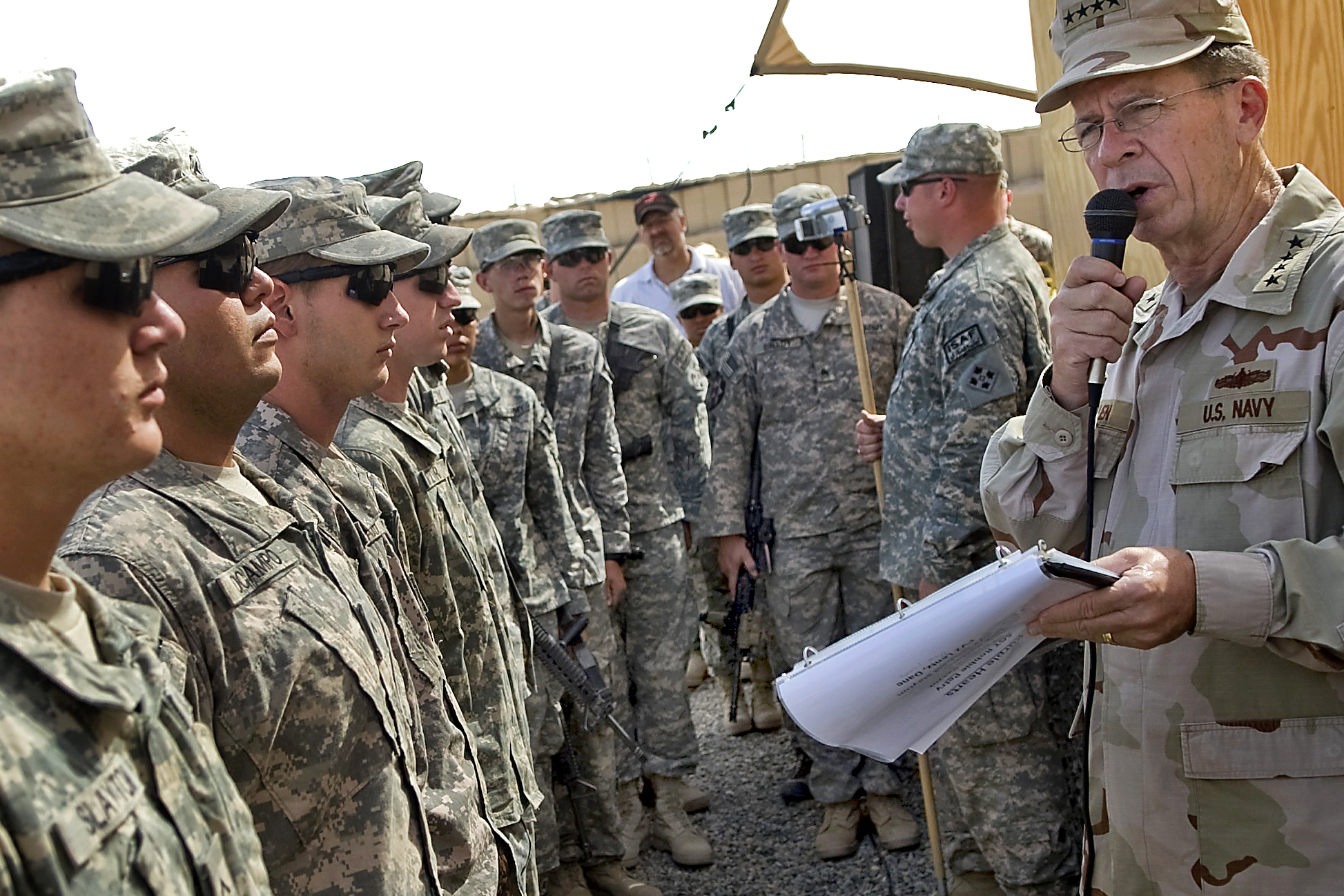
Admiral Mike Mullen reads the citations for seven soldiers receiving Purple Hearts for wounds sustained in Afghanistan

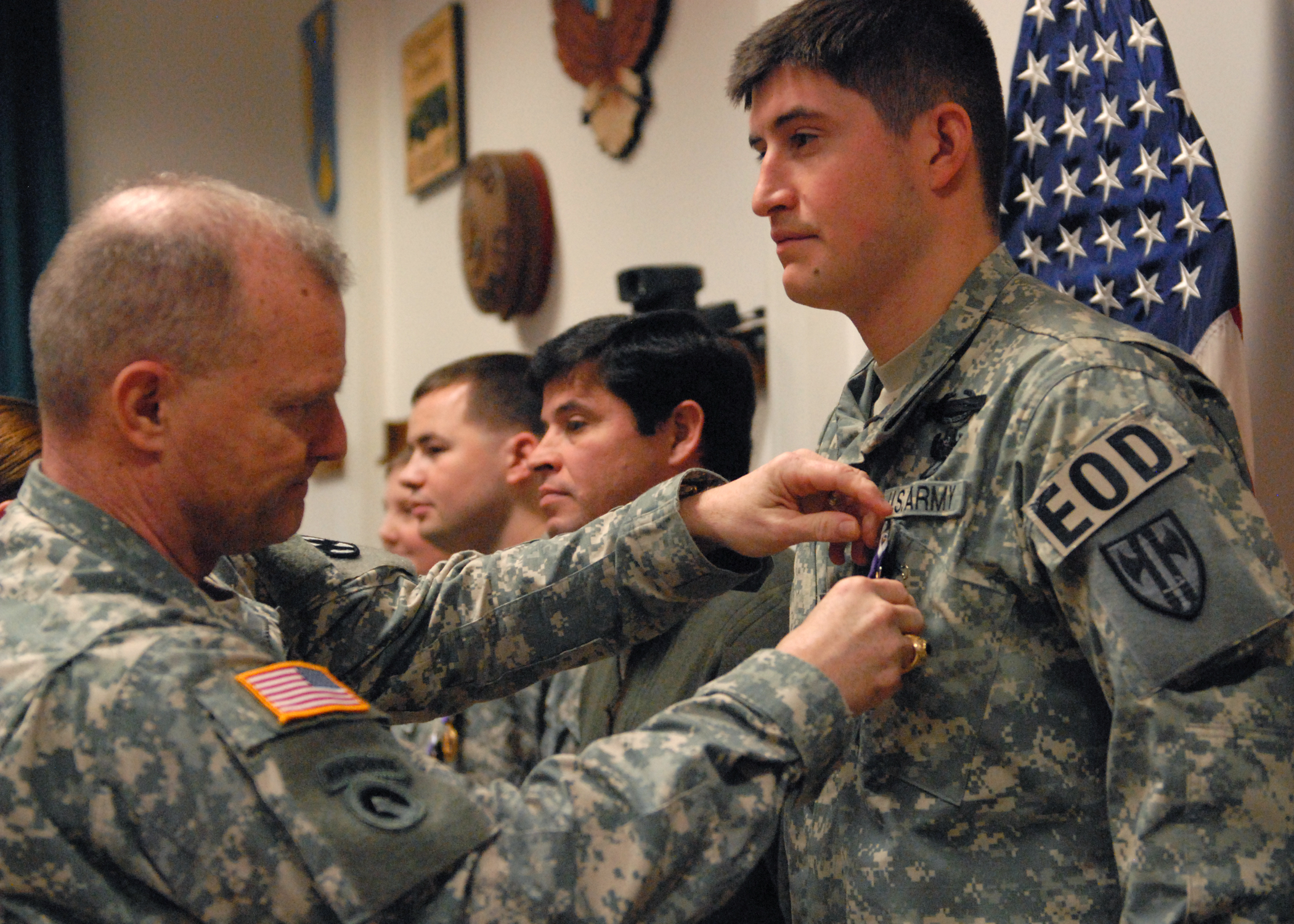
A soldier is awarded the Purple Heart during a ceremony on Coleman Barracks

The Purple Heart is awarded in the name of the President of the United States to any member of the Armed Forces of the United States who, while serving under competent authority in any capacity with one of the U.S. Armed Services after 5 April 1917, has been wounded or killed. Specific examples of services which warrant the Purple Heart include:

1. any action against an enemy of the United States;
2. any action with an opposing armed force of a foreign country in which the Armed Forces of the United States are or have been engaged;
3. while serving with friendly foreign forces engaged in an armed conflict against an opposing armed force in which the United States is not a belligerent party;
4. as a result of an act of any such enemy or opposing armed forces; or
5. as a result of an act of any hostile foreign force.

Criteria (c) and (e) were added by Executive Order 11016 on 25 April 1962, as U.S. service personnel were being sent to South Vietnam during the Vietnam War as military advisors rather than combatants. As many were being killed or wounded while serving in that capacity in South Vietnam, and because the United States was not formally a participant of the war (until 1965), there was no "enemy" to satisfy the requirement of a wound or death received "in action against an enemy". In response, President John F. Kennedy signed the executive order that awarded to any person wounded or killed "while serving with friendly foreign forces" or "as a result of action by a hostile foreign force".

After 28 March 1973, it may be awarded as a result of an international terrorist attack against the United States or a foreign nation friendly to the United States, recognized as such an attack by the Secretary of the Army, or jointly by the Secretaries of the separate armed services concerned if persons from more than one service are wounded in the attack. Also, it may be awarded as a result of military operations while serving outside the territory of the United States as part of a peacekeeping force.

Purple heart with oak leaves.

The Purple Heart differs from most other decorations in that an individual is not "recommended" for the decoration; rather the service member is entitled to it upon meeting specific criteria. A Purple Heart is awarded for the first wound suffered under conditions indicated above, but for each subsequent award an oak leaf cluster or 5/16 inch star is worn in lieu of another medal. Not more than one award will be made for more than one wound or injury received at the same instant.

A "wound" is defined as an injury to any part of the body from an outside force or agent sustained under one or more of the conditions listed above. A physical lesion is not required; however, the wound for which the award is made must have required treatment by a medical officer and records of medical treatment for wounds or injuries received in action must have been made a matter of official record. When contemplating an award of this decoration, the key issue that commanders must take into consideration is the degree to which the enemy caused the injury. The fact that the proposed recipient was participating in direct or indirect combat operations is a necessary prerequisite, but is not sole justification for award. The Purple Heart is not awarded for non-combat injuries.

Enemy-related injuries which justify the award of the Purple Heart include: injury caused by enemy bullet, shrapnel, or other projectile created by enemy action; injury caused by enemy placed land mine, naval mine, or trap; injury caused by enemy released chemical, biological, or nuclear agent; injury caused by vehicle or aircraft accident resulting from enemy fire; and, concussion injuries caused as a result of enemy generated explosions.

Injuries or wounds which do not qualify for award of the Purple Heart include frostbite or trench foot injuries; heat stroke; food poisoning not caused by enemy agents; chemical, biological, or nuclear agents not released by the enemy; battle fatigue; disease not directly caused by enemy agents; accidents, to include explosive, aircraft, vehicular, and other accidental wounding not related to or caused by enemy action; self-inflicted wounds (e.g., a soldier accidentally or intentionally fires their own gun and the bullet strikes their leg), except when in the heat of battle, and not involving gross negligence; post-traumatic stress disorders; and jump injuries not caused by enemy action.

It is not intended that such a strict interpretation of the requirement for the wound or injury to be caused by direct result of hostile action be taken that it would preclude the award being made to deserving personnel. Commanders must also take into consideration the circumstances surrounding an injury, even if it appears to meet the criteria. In the case of an individual injured while making a parachute landing from an aircraft that had been brought down by enemy fire; or, an individual injured as a result of a vehicle accident caused by enemy fire, the decision will be made in favor of the individual and the award will be made. Additionally, individuals wounded or killed as a result of "friendly fire" in the "heat of battle" will be awarded the Purple Heart as long as the "friendly" projectile or agent was released with the full intent of inflicting damage or destroying enemy troops or equipment. Individuals injured as a result of their own negligence, such as by driving or walking through an unauthorized area known to have been mined or placed off limits or searching for or picking up unexploded munitions as war souvenirs, will not be awarded the Purple Heart as they clearly were not injured as a result of enemy action, but rather by their own negligence.

Animals are generally not eligible for the Purple Heart; however, there have been rare instances when animals holding military rank were honored with the award. An example includes the horse Sergeant Reckless during the Korean War, and the dog Sergeant Stubby of the 102nd Infantry Regiment during World War 1.

=== Former eligibility ===
From 1942 to 1997, non-military personnel serving or closely affiliated with the armed forces—as government employees, Red Cross workers, war correspondents, and various other professions—were eligible to receive the Purple Heart whether in peacetime or armed conflicts. Among the earliest individuals to receive the award were nine Honolulu Fire Department (HFD) firefighters who were killed or wounded in peacetime while fighting fires at Hickam Field during the attack on Pearl Harbor. In total, about 100 men and women who served as non-military personnel received the award, the most famous being newspaperman Ernie Pyle, who was awarded a Purple Heart posthumously by the Army after being killed by Japanese machine gun fire in the Pacific Theater near the end of World War II. Pyle had previously seen and experienced combat in the European Theater while accompanying and writing about infantrymen for readers back home. Those serving in the Merchant Marine are not eligible for the award. During World War II, members of this service who met the Purple Heart criteria received a Merchant Marine Mariner's Medal instead.

The most recent Purple Hearts presented to non-military personnel occurred after the terrorist attacks at Khobar Towers, Saudi Arabia, in 1996—for their injuries, about 40 U.S. civil service employees received the award.

However, in 1997, at the urging of the Military Order of the Purple Heart, Congress passed legislation prohibiting future awards of the Purple Heart to non-military personnel. Civilian employees of the U.S. Department of Defense who are killed or wounded as a result of hostile action may receive the new Defense of Freedom Medal. This award was created shortly after the terrorist attacks of September 11, 2001.

== Appearance ==
The Purple Heart award is a 1 3/8-inch-wide (35 mm) purple- and gold-colored heart-shaped brass-alloy medal containing a profile of General George Washington. Above the heart appears a shield of the coat of arms of George Washington (a white shield with two red bars and three red stars in chief) between sprays of green leaves. The reverse consists of a raised bronze heart with the words FOR MILITARY MERIT below the coat of arms and leaves.

The ribbon is 1 3/8 inches (35 mm) wide and consists of the following stripes: 1/8 inch (3.2 mm) white 67101; 1 1/8 inches (29 mm) purple 67115; and 1/8 inch (3.2 mm) white 67101.

=== Devices ===
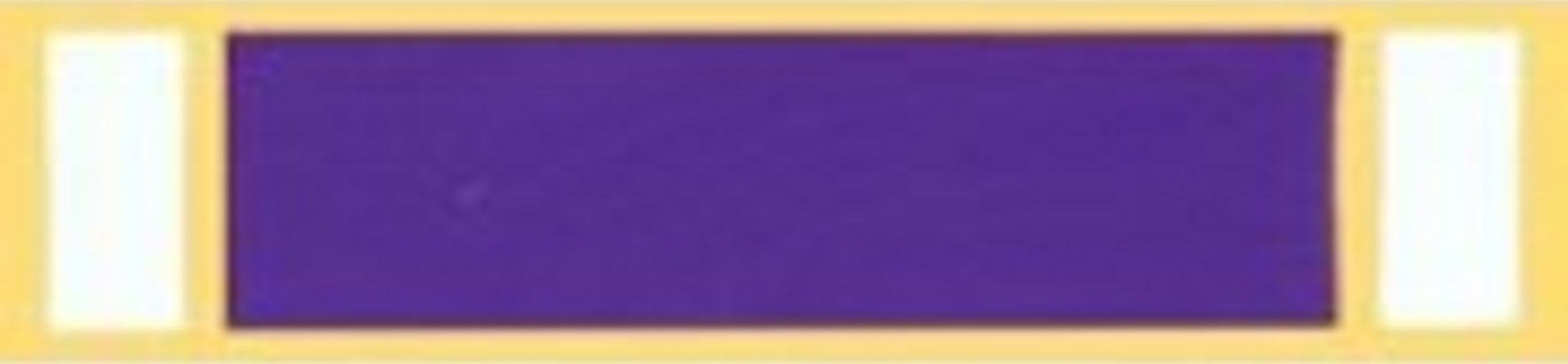
Lapel Pin

Additional awards of the Purple Heart are denoted by oak leaf clusters in the Army, Air Force, and Space Force, and additional awards of the Purple Heart Medal are denoted by 5/16 inch stars in the Navy, Marine Corps, and Coast Guard.

== Presentation ==
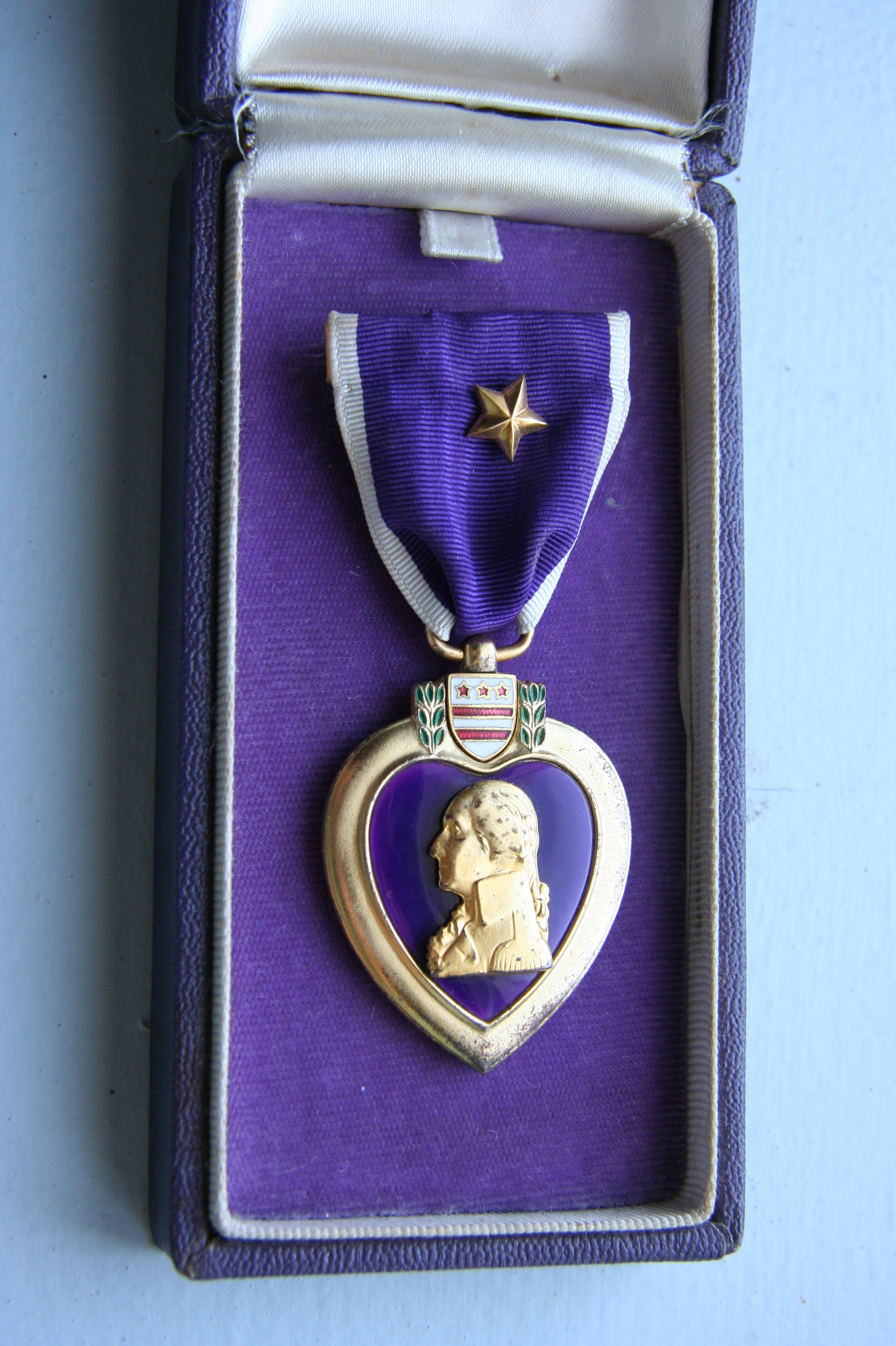
Purple Heart Medal with 5/16 Inch Gold Star in presentation case. USN-USMC, World War II.

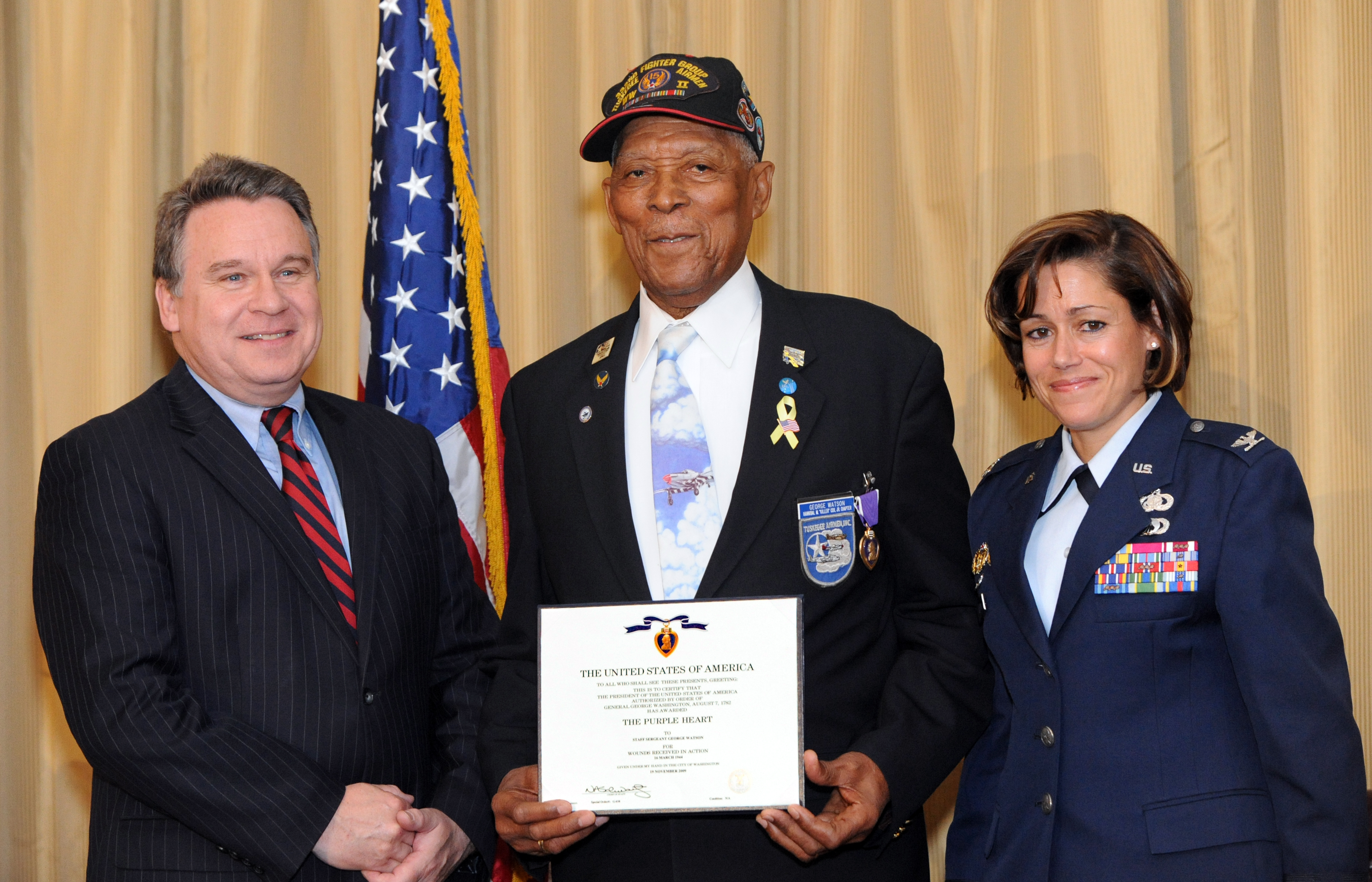
Congressman Christopher Smith presented the Purple Heart Medal to Tuskegee Airman Tech. Sgt. (Ret.) George Watson Sr. with then Col. Gina M. Grosso, Joint Base McGuire-Dix-Lakehurst commander

Current active duty personnel are awarded the Purple Heart upon recommendation from their chain of command, stating the injury that was received and the action in which the service member was wounded. The award authority for the Purple Heart is normally at the level of an Army Brigade, Marine Corps Division, Air Force wing, Space Force delta, or Navy Task Force. While the award of the Purple Heart is considered automatic for all wounds received in combat, each award presentation must still be reviewed to ensure that the wounds received were as a result of enemy action. Modern day Purple Heart presentations are recorded in both hardcopy and electronic service records. The annotation of the Purple Heart is denoted both with the service member's parent command and at the headquarters of the military service department. An original citation and award certificate are presented to the service member and filed in the field service record.

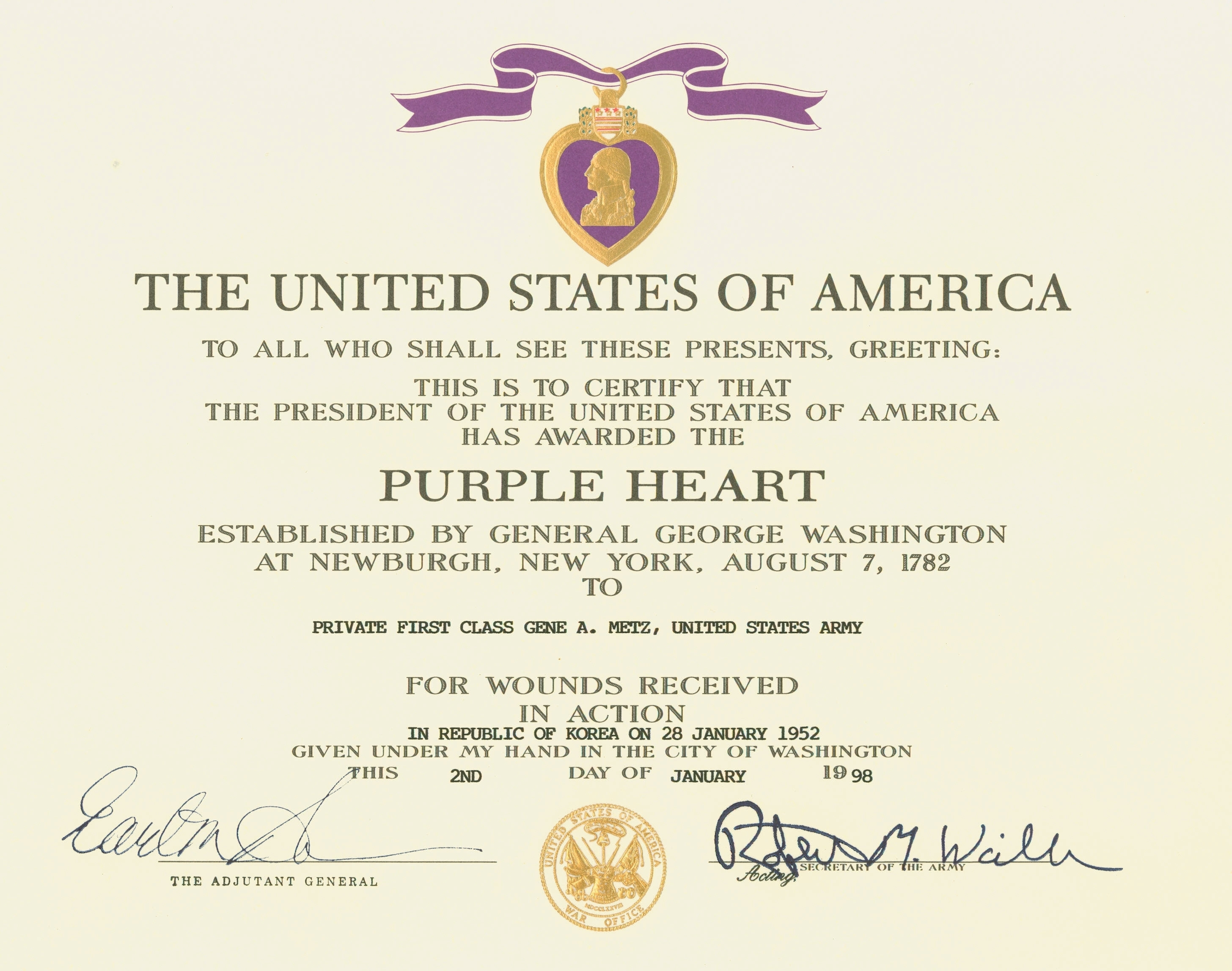
U.S. Army Purple Heart Certificate for a soldier wounded during the Korean War

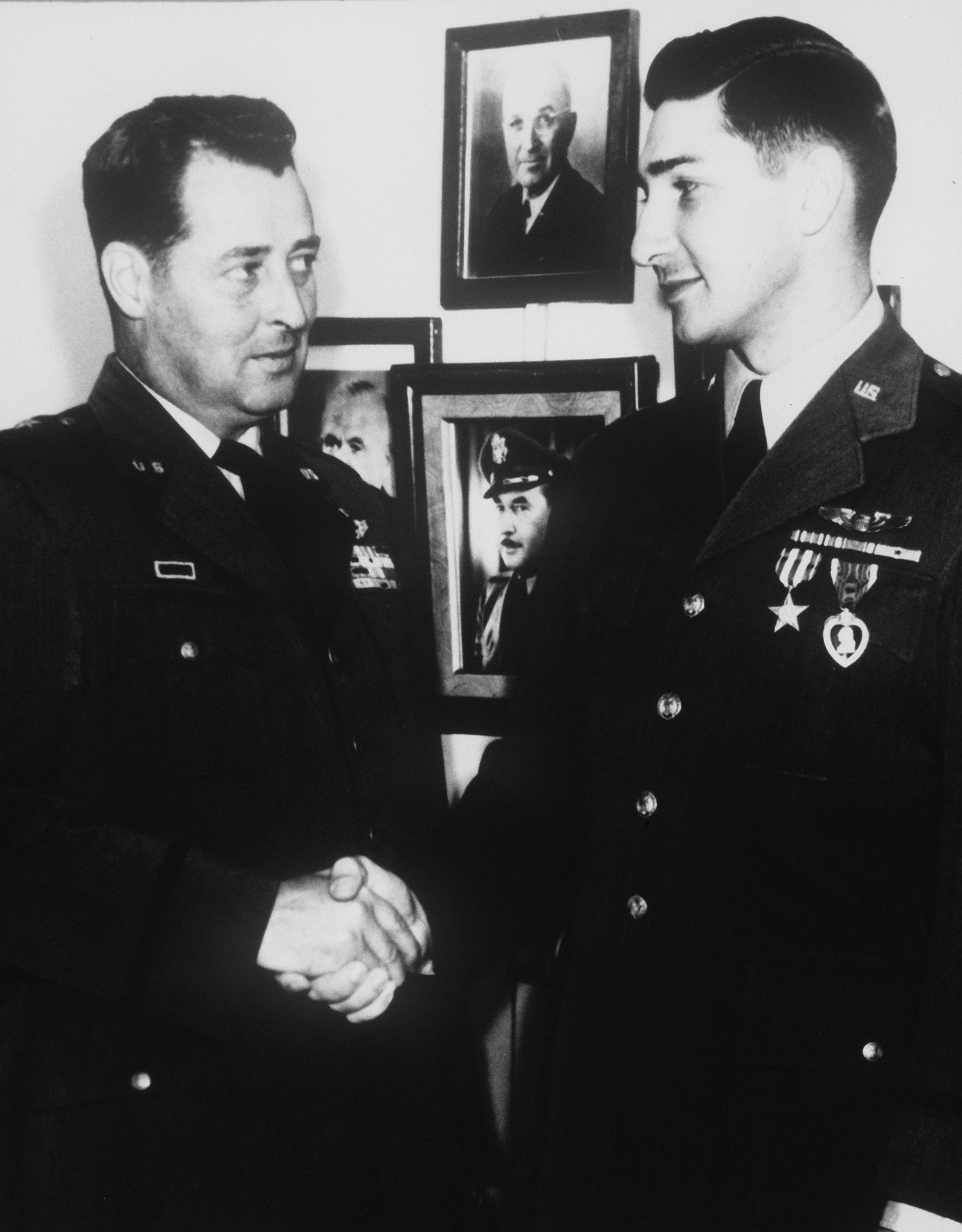
U.S. Air Force pilot Capt Lyle Bordeaux (r.) receiving the Purple Heart and Silver Star from Brig Gen Joe W. Kelly during the Korean War.

During the Vietnam War, Korean War, and World War II, the Purple Heart was often awarded on the spot, with occasional entries made into service records. In addition, during mass demobilizations following each of America's major wars of the 20th century, it was common occurrence to omit mention from service records of a Purple Heart award. This occurred due to clerical errors, and became problematic once a service record was closed upon discharge. In terms of keeping accurate records, it was commonplace for some field commanders to engage in bedside presentations of the Purple Heart. This typically entailed a general entering a hospital with a box of Purple Hearts, pinning them on the pillows of wounded service members, then departing with no official records kept of the visit, or the award of the Purple Heart. Service members, themselves, complicated matters by unofficially leaving hospitals, hastily returning to their units to rejoin battle so as not to appear a malingerer. In such cases, even if a service member had received actual wounds in combat, both the award of the Purple Heart, as well as the entire visit to the hospital, was unrecorded in official records.

Service members requesting retroactive awards of the Purple Heart must normally apply through the National Personnel Records Center. Following a review of service records, qualified Army members are awarded the Purple Heart by the U.S. Army Human Resources Command in Fort Knox, Kentucky. Air Force veterans are awarded the Purple Heart by the Awards Office of Randolph Air Force Base, while Navy, Marine Corps, and Coast Guard, present Purple Hearts to veterans through the Navy Liaison Officer at the National Personnel Records Center. Simple clerical errors, where a Purple Heart is denoted in military records, but was simply omitted from a WD AGO Form 53-55 (predecessor to the) DD Form 214 (Report of Separation), are corrected on site at the National Personnel Records Center through issuance of a DD-215 document.

== Notable recipients ==
Medal of Honor Recipients

- Robert L. Howard
- Lewis Millett
- Michael Ollis
- John Basilone
- Roy Benavidez
- Kyle Carpenter
- Alwyn Cashe
- John A. Chapman
- Sammy L. Davis
- Raymond G. Davis
- Ralph E. Dias
- William J. Donovan
- Desmond Doss
- Salvatore Giunta
- Gary Gordon
- Randy Shughart
- Daniel Inouye
- Bob Kerrey
- Douglas MacArthur
- Dakota Meyer
- Audie Murphy
- Michael P. Murphy
- Thomas Payne
- Ralph Puckett
- Theodore Roosevelt Jr.
- James Stockdale
- William D. Swenson
- Calvin Pearl Titus
- Jay R. Vargas
- Louis H. Wilson Jr.
- Gordon Douglas Yntema

Athletes and Sports

- Rocky Bleier
- Paul Boesch
- Frank Coker
- DuWayne Deitz
- Bud Moore
- Milton C. Portmann
- Barney Ross
- Ben Schwartzwalder
- Warren Spahn
- Champ Summers
- Pat Tillman
- Louis Zamperini

Actors and Celebrities

- James Arness
- Lex Barker
- Dan Blocker
- Charles Bronson
- Art Carney
- Donnie Dunagan
- Charles Durning
- Dale Dye
- John Ford
- Dean Fredericks
- Samuel Fuller
- James Garner
- Bill Graham
- Russell Johnson
- Lee Marvin
- Al Matthews
- Rod Serling
- Robert B. Sherman
- Oliver Stone
- Spencer Stone

Politicians

- J. Herbert Burke
- Wesley Clark
- Dan Crenshaw
- Bob Dole
- Paul Douglas
- Tammy Duckworth
- Eric Greitens
- M. J. Hegar
- John F. Kennedy
- John Kerry
- Melvin Laird
- John McCain
- Parren Mitchell
- Robert Mueller
- Nick Popaditch
- Colin Powell
- Franklin D. Roosevelt Jr.
- Tim Sheehy
- Eric Shinseki
- Bruce Sundlun
- Alex Vindman
- Jim Webb

Other

- Manny Babbitt
- Peter Badcoe
- Bryan B. Battaglia
- Joseph Beyrle
- Pappy Boyington
- Jesse L. Brown
- Mel Casas
- Joseph Newton Chandler III
- Llewellyn Chilson
- Cordelia E. Cook
- Steponas Darius
- Raymond G. Davis
- Danny Dietz
- W. D. Ehrhart
- Joe Ellis
- Thomas Fitzpatrick
- Samuel Folsom
- James M. Gavin
- Calvin Graham
- Harold J. Greene
- Bo Gritz
- Joe Haldeman
- Carlos Hathcock
- Raymond Jacobs
- James Jones
- Joseph P. Kennedy Jr.
- Shannon M. Kent
- Shawn Kirkpatrick
- J. T. Knott
- Ron Kovic
- Sharon Ann Lane
- Megan Leavey
- Robert Leckie
- Marcus Luttrell
- Aleda E. Lutz
- Jessica Lynch
- Victor Maghakian
- Karl Marlantes
- Robert Mellard
- Doris Miller
- Hal Moore
- Dennis J. Murphy
- Tim O'Brien
- Scott O'Grady
- Vincent Okamoto
- George S. Patton
- Geronimo Pratt
- Harry Pregerson
- Chesty Puller
- Lewis Burwell Puller Jr.
- Ernie Pyle
- Sergeant Reckless
- Matthew Ridgway
- Al Schmid
- Norman Schwarzkopf Jr.
- Jan Scruggs
- Don W. Sears
- Scott Speicher
- Siegmund Spiegel
- Robert Stethem
- William Stuart-Houston
- Sergeant Stubby
- Larry Thorne
- John Paul Vann
- Kurt Vonnegut
- Lewis William Walt
- Joshua Wheeler
- Richard Winters
- Chuck Yeager
- Tyler Ziegel

=== Most Purple Heart awards ===
Twelve Purple Hearts:

- Thomas "Tommy" Gwynn, U.S. Army, Distinguished Service Cross: World War II (7), Korean War (5)

Ten Purple Hearts:

- Charles D. Barger, U.S. Army, Medal of Honor: World War I (10)
- William G. White, U.S. Army: World War II (9), Korean War (1)
- Curry T. Haynes, U.S. Army: Vietnam War (10)
- CSM George Albert Vidrine, U.S. Army: World War II, Korean War, Vietnam War,

Nine Purple Hearts:

- Charles E. Ashton, U.S. Army: World War II (1), Korean War (8)
- Albert L. Ireland, U.S. Marine Corps: World War II (5), Korean War (4)
- John M. Cloninger Jr., U.S. Army: World War II (5), Korean War (4)

Eight Purple Hearts:

- Bobbie E. Brown, U.S. Army: Medal of Honor: World War II (8)
- John J. Duffy, U.S. Army: Medal of Honor: Vietnam War (8)
- Robert T. Frederick, U.S. Army: World War II (8)
- David Hackworth, U.S. Army: Korean War (3), Vietnam War (5)
- Joe Hooper, U.S. Army: Medal of Honor: Vietnam War (8)
- Robert L. Howard, U.S. Army: Medal of Honor: Vietnam War (8)
- William Waugh, U.S. Army: Vietnam War (8)
- Richard J. Buck, U.S. Army: Korean War (4),Vietnam War (4)
- William L. Russell, U.S. Army: World War II (8)

Seven Purple Hearts:

- Matt Urban, U.S. Army: Medal of Honor: World War II (7)
- David A. Christian, U.S. Army: Vietnam War (7)
- Randy McConnell, U.S. Army: Vietnam War (7)
- Olinto M. Barsanti, U.S. Army: World War II (4), Korean War (1), Vietnam War (2)
- Lionel C. McGarr, U.S. Army: World War II (5), Korean War (2)
- Robert L. Schweitzer, U.S. Army: Vietnam War (7)

== See also ==
- DEA Purple Heart Award
- Gold Star Lapel Button
- Law Enforcement Purple Heart
- List of wound decorations by country
- Secretary of Defense Medal for the Defense of Freedom
- Texas Purple Heart Medal
- Thomas Jefferson Star for Foreign Service (State Department)
- Wound stripe
