= Wound Medal (India) =

Military Award

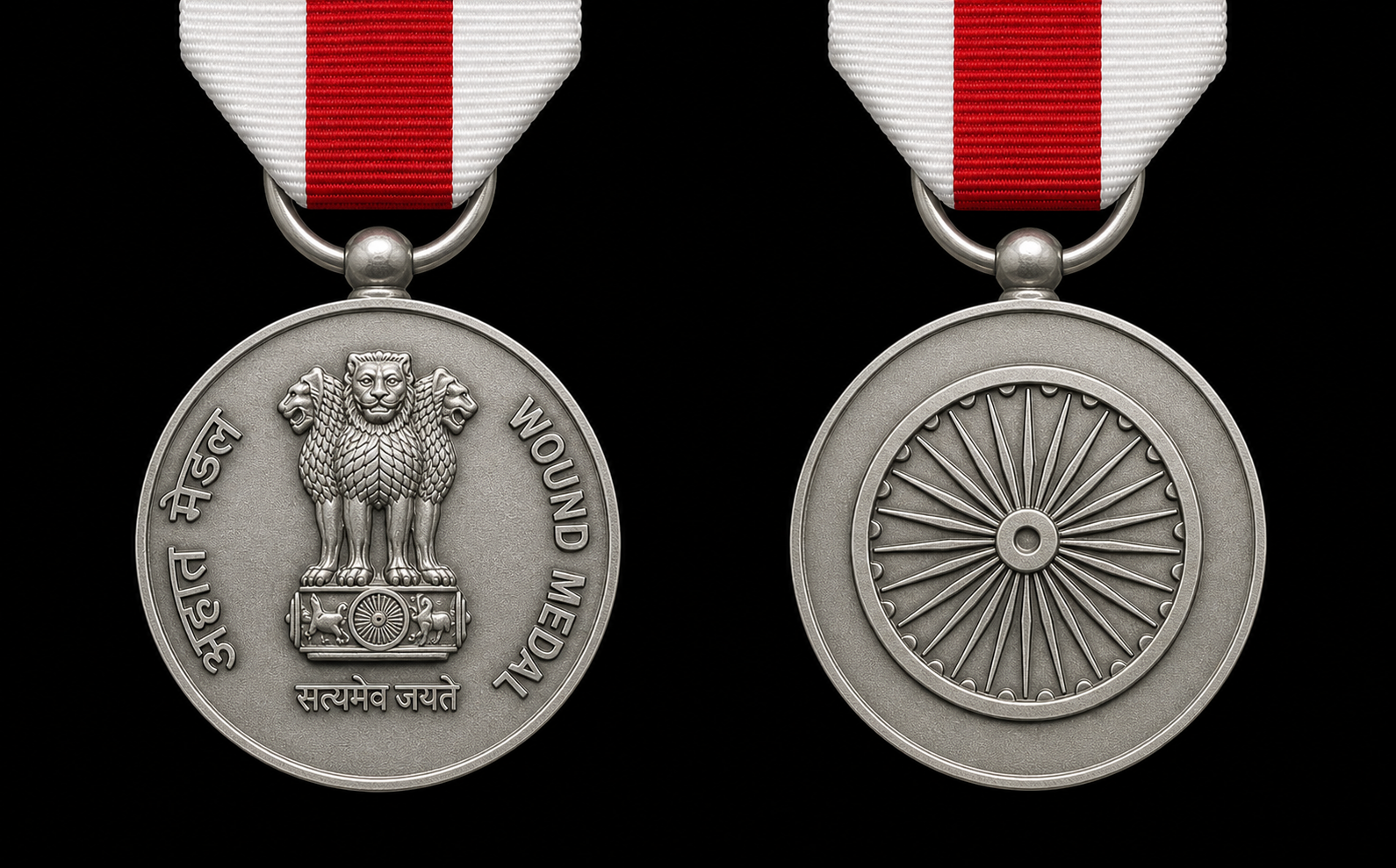
- Type: Military medal
- Country: India
- Presented by: Govt. of India
- Ribbon
- Established: 1973, awards backdated to 15 August 1947

Precedence
- Next (higher): Uttam Jeevan Raksha Padak
- Next (lower): General Service Medal

The Wound Medal or Parakram Padak is an Indian Military award given to those who sustain "wounds as a result of direct enemy action in any type of operations or counter-insurgency actions." The medal was established in 1973, by the President of India for wounds back dated to 15 August 1947.

== Criteria ==
Eligible categories include all ranks of the Indian military, including reserve and territorial forces, and members of the Railway Protection Force, police, Home Guards, civil defense, or any other organization specified by the government. Aircrews who, in the course of bailing out of an aircraft destroyed by hostile action may be awarded if they sustain injuries (and not, specifically, "wounds").

The medal may not be awarded posthumously. Specific provision is made for bars for subsequent awards.

== Appearance ==
Obverse: A 35-mm circular silver medal with the national emblem in the center. To the left, the Hindi legend "Ahat Medal" and to the right "WOUND MEDAL". The medal is suspended by a ring and is named on the edge with impressed capital letters.

Reverse: Within a circle, Ashoka's chakra.

Ribbon: 32 mm, white, with a 10 mm red central stripe. White 11 mm, red 10 mm, white 11 mm.

== See also ==
- List of wound decorations by country
