= Medal for the War Wounded =

French military decoration

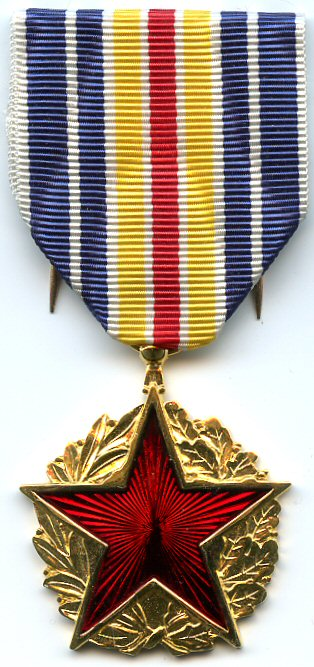
- Obverse
- Type: State award
- Awarded for: Injury sustained in combat
- Presented by: France
- Eligibility: Members of the French Armed Forces, French nationals
- Status: Active
- First award: 17 August 2016
- Ribbon of the award bearing a single wound star

Precedence
- Next (higher): Médaille de la Gendarmerie nationale
- Next (lower): Resistance Medal

The Medal for the War Wounded (French: Médaille des blessés de guerre) is a military decoration of France. It was originally a mere insignia in the form of a ribbon awarded for wounds received in the line of duty while facing an enemy. The insignia was established by the law of 11 December 1916, based on an idea by the nationalist writer Maurice Barrès. Although originally established as a temporary measure, the insignia survived for a century in some form or another. It could be awarded to wounded soldiers, prisoners of war, to World War II deportees and internees from the French resistance and to soldiers wounded in more recent conflicts. A variety of unofficial medals in the form of a red enamelled star suspended by the same ribbon appeared very early on and although tolerated for wear by the authorities, were not official until recently.

A provisional instruction of 14 April 2015 from the French Army High Command began the proceedings which were later ratified in the official decree n° 2016-1130 of 17 August 2016 making the Medal for the War Wounded a state decoration of the French Republic. A recent 2017 amendment further simplified the regulations of this award by allowing all past recipients to keep wearing it but strictly limiting any future award to military personnel.

== Statute ==
The Medal for the War Wounded can be worn by:

- Military personnel suffering from a physical or mental war wound, ascertained by the army health service and approved by the Minister of Defence;
- Prisoners of war, physically or psychologically wounded during their detention.

Article 3 of the new regulation states that the wear of this medal is not subordinate to an official ceremony of award.

Article 4 of the new regulation further states that persons who were eligible for and wore the now defunct insignia as mentioned in Article 2 of the now abrogated 1952 law governing its wear (resistance deportees and internees), may wear the medal.

== Award description ==
The Medal for the War Wounded is made of gilded bronze with a 30 mm diameter. It is mainly composed of a large bright red enamelled five pointed star atop a crown of half laurels (left) and half oak leaves (right).

The medal is suspended by a ring from a 35 mm wide silk moiré ribbon composed of vertical stripes in the following colours: white 1 mm - blue 5 mm - white 1 mm - blue 4 mm - white 1 mm - yellow 3 mm - white 1 mm - beginning out the outer edge on both sides of a 3 mm wide central red stripe.

Small enamel red five pointed stars are added to the medal ribbon and undress ribbon for each additional wound.

Unofficial medal early variant set in starburst	Indochina medal correctly bearing the old insignia

== Notable recipients (partial list) ==
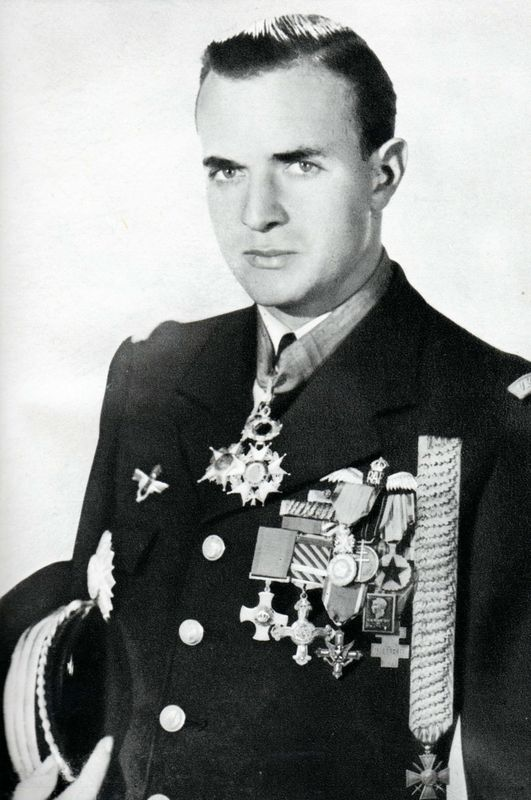
World War II fighter ace Pierre Clostermann, a recipient of the Insigne des blessés militaires

- Sergeant André Maginot
- General Pierre Billotte
- Major Hélie de Saint Marc
- General Raoul Salan
- Resistance fighter André Girard
- General Edgard de Larminat
- Foreign Legion Captain John Freeman "Jack" Hasey
- Lieutenant-Colonel Pierre Clostermann
- Sergeant Eugene Bullard
- Captain Pierre-Eugène Fournier
- General Gilbert Henry
- Lieutenant Jean Carrelet de Loisy
- Major Jean-Edmond Lamaze
- Lieutenant-Colonel Alfred Maurice Cazaud
- Lieutenant-Colonel Jean Vérines
- General Félix de Vial

== See also ==
- List of wound decorations
