= Wound Medal (Independent State of Croatia) =

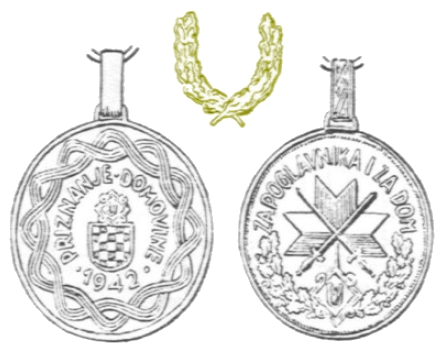
Wound Medal

The Wound Medal (Croatian: Ranjenička kolajna) was established by the Independent State of Croatia "in honor of those who, as homeland defenders, were wounded or injured during combat with the enemy".

The medal had eight classes:

1. Golden with oak leaves (Croatian: Pozlaćena s hrastovim grančicama)
2. Golden with three stripes (Croatian: Pozlaćena s tri pruge)
3. Golden with two stripes (Croatian: Pozlaćena s dvije pruge)
4. Golden with one stripe (Croatian: Pozlaćena s jednom prugom)
5. Iron with oak leaves (Croatian: Željezna s hrastovim grančicama)
6. Iron with three stripes (Croatian: Željezna s tri pruge)
7. Iron with two stripes (Croatian: Željezna s dvije pruge)
8. Iron with one stripe (Croatian: Željezna s jednom prugom)

A golden wound medal was rewarded to those who had 61% (or more) of physical disability and killed, while iron wound medal was rewarded to those who had up to 60% of physical disability. The number of injuries was marked with one, two or three blue stripes, and for those who had more than three injuries, oak leaves were awarded.

The Wound Medal was introduced in mid-1943. As of 30 June 1944, 6,525 Wound Medals were awarded.

== Sources ==
- Hrvatska odlikovanja (Croatian decorations) (mr. sc. Stjepan Adanić, general-major Krešimir Kašpar, prof. Boris Prister, prof. Ivan Ružič)
- Pavić, Roman (2012). "Dodjela odlikovanja Nezavisne Države Hrvatske prema nacionalnoj pripadnosti" [Decorations awarded by the Independent State of Croatia according to nationality] (PDF). Numizmatičke vijesti (in Croatian). 54 (65): 192–205.
