= Wound Chevron =

Former United States military insignia

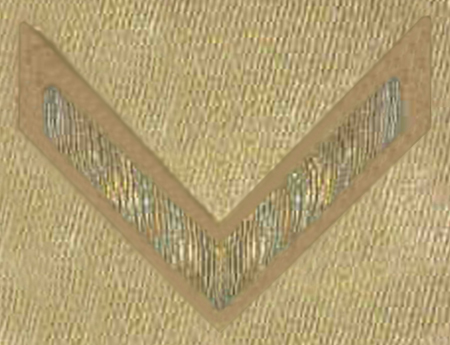
- Wound Chevron worn on a World War I era U.S. Army officer's coat.
- Designer: United States Army
- Year: 1918–1953
- Type: Patch
- Material: Cloth

A Wound Chevron was a United States military insignia authorized for wear on the service uniform between 1918 and 1932. The Wound Chevron was a gold metallic-thread chevron on an Olive Drab backing displayed on the lower right cuff of a US military uniform. It denoted wounds which were received in combat against an enemy force or hospitalization following a gassing.

== History ==
=== Army Wound Ribbon ===
Army Wound Ribbon
- Army Wound Ribbon
- Type: Ribbon
- Presented by: Department of War
- Status: Obsolete

The original Army Wound Ribbon was created on September 6, 1917, to recognize those soldiers who had received combat wounds during World War I. The Wound Ribbon was established by Secretary of War Newton D. Baker on September 6, 1917, and implemented by Paragraph XI-1 of War Department General Orders Number 134 of October 12, 1917. However, it was rescinded by Paragraph 1(d) of War Department General Orders Number 6 of January 12, 1918, which replaced it with wound chevrons.

The Wound Chevron was a replacement insignia for the short-lived Army Wound Ribbon of 1917 and was issued to Army, Navy and Marine Corps personnel who had been wounded in combat.

=== Purple Heart ===
In 1932, with the creation of the Purple Heart, Wound Chevrons were no longer awarded. A directive of the United States War Department and United States Navy Department permitted soldiers to exchange wound chevrons for the new Purple Heart medal. This was not required, however, and some Army personnel elected to retain wound chevrons for wear on their uniforms instead of the Purple Heart. For those who were subsequently wounded, both the original wound chevrons and the Purple Heart medal were worn simultaneously. It is historically agreed that regulations did not permit wearing both the Purple Heart and the Wound Chevron at the same time; however, photographic evidence indicates that this was often done by veterans of both the First World War and Second World War. Its wear on the uniform was abolished in 1953, as the Overseas Service Bars were moved there.

In the modern military, the Wound Chevron is considered obsolete. The decoration is very similar to the Overseas Chevron, which in World War I was worn on the left sleeve.

== See also ==
- List of wound decorations
- Military badges of the United States
